

365001–365100 

|-bgcolor=#d6d6d6
| 365001 ||  || — || May 27, 2008 || Kitt Peak || Spacewatch || — || align=right | 2.5 km || 
|-id=002 bgcolor=#d6d6d6
| 365002 ||  || — || May 27, 2008 || Kitt Peak || Spacewatch || EOS || align=right | 1.9 km || 
|-id=003 bgcolor=#d6d6d6
| 365003 ||  || — || April 6, 2008 || Kitt Peak || Spacewatch || EOS || align=right | 1.4 km || 
|-id=004 bgcolor=#d6d6d6
| 365004 ||  || — || April 6, 2008 || Mount Lemmon || Mount Lemmon Survey || EOS || align=right | 2.1 km || 
|-id=005 bgcolor=#d6d6d6
| 365005 ||  || — || May 30, 2008 || Kitt Peak || Spacewatch || — || align=right | 2.4 km || 
|-id=006 bgcolor=#d6d6d6
| 365006 ||  || — || May 29, 2008 || Mount Lemmon || Mount Lemmon Survey || EMA || align=right | 3.1 km || 
|-id=007 bgcolor=#d6d6d6
| 365007 ||  || — || June 1, 2008 || Mount Lemmon || Mount Lemmon Survey || — || align=right | 2.4 km || 
|-id=008 bgcolor=#d6d6d6
| 365008 ||  || — || June 3, 2008 || Mount Lemmon || Mount Lemmon Survey || — || align=right | 3.6 km || 
|-id=009 bgcolor=#fefefe
| 365009 ||  || — || June 3, 2008 || Kitt Peak || Spacewatch || — || align=right data-sort-value="0.81" | 810 m || 
|-id=010 bgcolor=#d6d6d6
| 365010 ||  || — || June 10, 2008 || Magdalena Ridge || W. H. Ryan || VER || align=right | 3.0 km || 
|-id=011 bgcolor=#d6d6d6
| 365011 ||  || — || June 7, 2008 || Kitt Peak || Spacewatch || — || align=right | 2.2 km || 
|-id=012 bgcolor=#d6d6d6
| 365012 ||  || — || June 2, 2008 || Mount Lemmon || Mount Lemmon Survey || — || align=right | 3.1 km || 
|-id=013 bgcolor=#fefefe
| 365013 ||  || — || July 26, 2008 || Antares || ARO || H || align=right data-sort-value="0.97" | 970 m || 
|-id=014 bgcolor=#FFC2E0
| 365014 ||  || — || July 28, 2008 || Mount Lemmon || Mount Lemmon Survey || APOPHAcritical || align=right data-sort-value="0.32" | 320 m || 
|-id=015 bgcolor=#d6d6d6
| 365015 ||  || — || July 29, 2008 || Črni Vrh || Črni Vrh || — || align=right | 3.0 km || 
|-id=016 bgcolor=#d6d6d6
| 365016 ||  || — || July 26, 2008 || Siding Spring || SSS || — || align=right | 3.1 km || 
|-id=017 bgcolor=#d6d6d6
| 365017 ||  || — || August 5, 2008 || La Sagra || OAM Obs. || — || align=right | 5.3 km || 
|-id=018 bgcolor=#d6d6d6
| 365018 ||  || — || August 11, 2008 || Pla D'Arguines || R. Ferrando || EOS || align=right | 1.8 km || 
|-id=019 bgcolor=#d6d6d6
| 365019 ||  || — || August 20, 2008 || Kitt Peak || Spacewatch || — || align=right | 3.5 km || 
|-id=020 bgcolor=#fefefe
| 365020 ||  || — || August 26, 2008 || Farra d'Isonzo || Farra d'Isonzo || — || align=right data-sort-value="0.87" | 870 m || 
|-id=021 bgcolor=#d6d6d6
| 365021 ||  || — || July 29, 2008 || Kitt Peak || Spacewatch || — || align=right | 3.0 km || 
|-id=022 bgcolor=#d6d6d6
| 365022 ||  || — || August 26, 2008 || Dauban || F. Kugel || — || align=right | 3.8 km || 
|-id=023 bgcolor=#d6d6d6
| 365023 ||  || — || August 30, 2008 || Socorro || LINEAR || — || align=right | 3.2 km || 
|-id=024 bgcolor=#d6d6d6
| 365024 ||  || — || September 2, 2008 || Kitt Peak || Spacewatch || — || align=right | 2.6 km || 
|-id=025 bgcolor=#d6d6d6
| 365025 ||  || — || September 2, 2008 || Kitt Peak || Spacewatch || EMA || align=right | 3.1 km || 
|-id=026 bgcolor=#d6d6d6
| 365026 ||  || — || September 2, 2008 || Kitt Peak || Spacewatch || 3:2 || align=right | 5.9 km || 
|-id=027 bgcolor=#d6d6d6
| 365027 ||  || — || September 8, 2008 || Kitt Peak || Spacewatch || LUT || align=right | 3.9 km || 
|-id=028 bgcolor=#d6d6d6
| 365028 ||  || — || September 5, 2008 || Socorro || LINEAR || EOS || align=right | 2.5 km || 
|-id=029 bgcolor=#fefefe
| 365029 ||  || — || September 23, 2008 || Catalina || CSS || H || align=right data-sort-value="0.63" | 630 m || 
|-id=030 bgcolor=#d6d6d6
| 365030 ||  || — || September 24, 2008 || Kachina || J. Hobart || — || align=right | 3.0 km || 
|-id=031 bgcolor=#fefefe
| 365031 ||  || — || September 19, 2008 || Kitt Peak || Spacewatch || H || align=right data-sort-value="0.60" | 600 m || 
|-id=032 bgcolor=#d6d6d6
| 365032 ||  || — || September 19, 2008 || Kitt Peak || Spacewatch || MEL || align=right | 3.4 km || 
|-id=033 bgcolor=#d6d6d6
| 365033 ||  || — || September 23, 2008 || Catalina || CSS || Tj (2.98) || align=right | 3.5 km || 
|-id=034 bgcolor=#d6d6d6
| 365034 ||  || — || September 26, 2008 || Sierra Stars || F. Tozzi || — || align=right | 6.6 km || 
|-id=035 bgcolor=#fefefe
| 365035 ||  || — || September 24, 2008 || Mount Lemmon || Mount Lemmon Survey || — || align=right | 1.2 km || 
|-id=036 bgcolor=#E9E9E9
| 365036 ||  || — || September 23, 2008 || Catalina || CSS || — || align=right | 2.2 km || 
|-id=037 bgcolor=#C2FFFF
| 365037 ||  || — || September 24, 2008 || Kitt Peak || Spacewatch || L4ERY || align=right | 8.4 km || 
|-id=038 bgcolor=#d6d6d6
| 365038 ||  || — || September 24, 2008 || Catalina || CSS || — || align=right | 3.2 km || 
|-id=039 bgcolor=#fefefe
| 365039 ||  || — || September 28, 2008 || Catalina || CSS || H || align=right data-sort-value="0.54" | 540 m || 
|-id=040 bgcolor=#fefefe
| 365040 ||  || — || November 6, 2003 || Socorro || LINEAR || H || align=right data-sort-value="0.75" | 750 m || 
|-id=041 bgcolor=#d6d6d6
| 365041 ||  || — || October 1, 2008 || Mount Lemmon || Mount Lemmon Survey || EOS || align=right | 2.4 km || 
|-id=042 bgcolor=#d6d6d6
| 365042 ||  || — || October 2, 2008 || Kitt Peak || Spacewatch || — || align=right | 4.0 km || 
|-id=043 bgcolor=#d6d6d6
| 365043 ||  || — || October 6, 2008 || Catalina || CSS || EOS || align=right | 2.5 km || 
|-id=044 bgcolor=#d6d6d6
| 365044 ||  || — || October 8, 2008 || Mount Lemmon || Mount Lemmon Survey || EOS || align=right | 2.3 km || 
|-id=045 bgcolor=#E9E9E9
| 365045 ||  || — || September 21, 2008 || Mount Lemmon || Mount Lemmon Survey || — || align=right | 2.4 km || 
|-id=046 bgcolor=#d6d6d6
| 365046 ||  || — || October 30, 2008 || Mount Lemmon || Mount Lemmon Survey || — || align=right | 3.4 km || 
|-id=047 bgcolor=#d6d6d6
| 365047 ||  || — || October 30, 2008 || Mount Lemmon || Mount Lemmon Survey || — || align=right | 3.2 km || 
|-id=048 bgcolor=#fefefe
| 365048 ||  || — || October 26, 2008 || Mount Lemmon || Mount Lemmon Survey || — || align=right | 1.1 km || 
|-id=049 bgcolor=#d6d6d6
| 365049 ||  || — || November 6, 2008 || Kitt Peak || Spacewatch || — || align=right | 4.2 km || 
|-id=050 bgcolor=#fefefe
| 365050 ||  || — || November 6, 2008 || Mount Lemmon || Mount Lemmon Survey || — || align=right data-sort-value="0.68" | 680 m || 
|-id=051 bgcolor=#fefefe
| 365051 ||  || — || November 18, 2008 || La Sagra || OAM Obs. || H || align=right data-sort-value="0.78" | 780 m || 
|-id=052 bgcolor=#d6d6d6
| 365052 ||  || — || November 17, 2008 || Kitt Peak || Spacewatch || — || align=right | 1.9 km || 
|-id=053 bgcolor=#fefefe
| 365053 ||  || — || November 17, 2008 || Kitt Peak || Spacewatch || — || align=right data-sort-value="0.71" | 710 m || 
|-id=054 bgcolor=#fefefe
| 365054 ||  || — || November 17, 2008 || Kitt Peak || Spacewatch || — || align=right data-sort-value="0.59" | 590 m || 
|-id=055 bgcolor=#fefefe
| 365055 ||  || — || October 28, 2008 || Kitt Peak || Spacewatch || FLO || align=right data-sort-value="0.45" | 450 m || 
|-id=056 bgcolor=#fefefe
| 365056 ||  || — || December 2, 2008 || Socorro || LINEAR || H || align=right data-sort-value="0.75" | 750 m || 
|-id=057 bgcolor=#fefefe
| 365057 ||  || — || December 21, 2008 || Mount Lemmon || Mount Lemmon Survey || — || align=right data-sort-value="0.68" | 680 m || 
|-id=058 bgcolor=#fefefe
| 365058 ||  || — || December 21, 2008 || Kitt Peak || Spacewatch || V || align=right data-sort-value="0.76" | 760 m || 
|-id=059 bgcolor=#fefefe
| 365059 ||  || — || December 22, 2008 || Kitt Peak || Spacewatch || — || align=right data-sort-value="0.82" | 820 m || 
|-id=060 bgcolor=#fefefe
| 365060 ||  || — || December 29, 2008 || Kitt Peak || Spacewatch || — || align=right data-sort-value="0.62" | 620 m || 
|-id=061 bgcolor=#E9E9E9
| 365061 ||  || — || October 24, 2008 || Mount Lemmon || Mount Lemmon Survey || — || align=right | 1.6 km || 
|-id=062 bgcolor=#fefefe
| 365062 ||  || — || December 30, 2008 || Mount Lemmon || Mount Lemmon Survey || NYS || align=right data-sort-value="0.56" | 560 m || 
|-id=063 bgcolor=#fefefe
| 365063 ||  || — || December 4, 2008 || Mount Lemmon || Mount Lemmon Survey || FLO || align=right data-sort-value="0.62" | 620 m || 
|-id=064 bgcolor=#fefefe
| 365064 ||  || — || December 29, 2008 || Kitt Peak || Spacewatch || NYS || align=right data-sort-value="0.54" | 540 m || 
|-id=065 bgcolor=#fefefe
| 365065 ||  || — || December 29, 2008 || Kitt Peak || Spacewatch || — || align=right data-sort-value="0.70" | 700 m || 
|-id=066 bgcolor=#fefefe
| 365066 ||  || — || December 29, 2008 || Kitt Peak || Spacewatch || — || align=right data-sort-value="0.63" | 630 m || 
|-id=067 bgcolor=#fefefe
| 365067 ||  || — || December 30, 2008 || Kitt Peak || Spacewatch || — || align=right data-sort-value="0.75" | 750 m || 
|-id=068 bgcolor=#fefefe
| 365068 ||  || — || December 30, 2008 || Kitt Peak || Spacewatch || — || align=right data-sort-value="0.73" | 730 m || 
|-id=069 bgcolor=#fefefe
| 365069 ||  || — || December 30, 2008 || Mount Lemmon || Mount Lemmon Survey || — || align=right data-sort-value="0.68" | 680 m || 
|-id=070 bgcolor=#fefefe
| 365070 ||  || — || December 30, 2008 || Kitt Peak || Spacewatch || — || align=right data-sort-value="0.55" | 550 m || 
|-id=071 bgcolor=#FFC2E0
| 365071 ||  || — || January 2, 2009 || Mount Lemmon || Mount Lemmon Survey || APO +1kmPHAcritical || align=right data-sort-value="0.67" | 670 m || 
|-id=072 bgcolor=#fefefe
| 365072 ||  || — || January 2, 2009 || Mount Lemmon || Mount Lemmon Survey || — || align=right data-sort-value="0.71" | 710 m || 
|-id=073 bgcolor=#fefefe
| 365073 ||  || — || January 15, 2009 || Kitt Peak || Spacewatch || — || align=right data-sort-value="0.68" | 680 m || 
|-id=074 bgcolor=#fefefe
| 365074 ||  || — || January 3, 2009 || Mount Lemmon || Mount Lemmon Survey || — || align=right data-sort-value="0.80" | 800 m || 
|-id=075 bgcolor=#E9E9E9
| 365075 ||  || — || March 4, 2005 || Catalina || CSS || — || align=right | 1.3 km || 
|-id=076 bgcolor=#fefefe
| 365076 ||  || — || January 22, 2009 || Socorro || LINEAR || FLO || align=right data-sort-value="0.85" | 850 m || 
|-id=077 bgcolor=#fefefe
| 365077 ||  || — || February 27, 2006 || Kitt Peak || Spacewatch || — || align=right data-sort-value="0.78" | 780 m || 
|-id=078 bgcolor=#fefefe
| 365078 ||  || — || January 16, 2009 || Kitt Peak || Spacewatch || — || align=right data-sort-value="0.74" | 740 m || 
|-id=079 bgcolor=#fefefe
| 365079 ||  || — || January 16, 2009 || Kitt Peak || Spacewatch || FLO || align=right data-sort-value="0.61" | 610 m || 
|-id=080 bgcolor=#fefefe
| 365080 ||  || — || January 16, 2009 || Kitt Peak || Spacewatch || NYS || align=right data-sort-value="0.67" | 670 m || 
|-id=081 bgcolor=#fefefe
| 365081 ||  || — || January 28, 2009 || Dauban || F. Kugel || — || align=right data-sort-value="0.77" | 770 m || 
|-id=082 bgcolor=#fefefe
| 365082 ||  || — || January 28, 2009 || Hibiscus || N. Teamo || NYS || align=right data-sort-value="0.62" | 620 m || 
|-id=083 bgcolor=#fefefe
| 365083 ||  || — || January 25, 2009 || Kitt Peak || Spacewatch || FLO || align=right data-sort-value="0.75" | 750 m || 
|-id=084 bgcolor=#E9E9E9
| 365084 ||  || — || January 29, 2009 || Mount Lemmon || Mount Lemmon Survey || TIN || align=right | 1.8 km || 
|-id=085 bgcolor=#fefefe
| 365085 ||  || — || December 22, 2008 || Mount Lemmon || Mount Lemmon Survey || FLO || align=right data-sort-value="0.57" | 570 m || 
|-id=086 bgcolor=#fefefe
| 365086 ||  || — || January 25, 2009 || Kitt Peak || Spacewatch || — || align=right data-sort-value="0.68" | 680 m || 
|-id=087 bgcolor=#fefefe
| 365087 ||  || — || January 26, 2009 || Purple Mountain || PMO NEO || ERI || align=right | 1.8 km || 
|-id=088 bgcolor=#fefefe
| 365088 ||  || — || January 28, 2009 || Catalina || CSS || NYS || align=right data-sort-value="0.74" | 740 m || 
|-id=089 bgcolor=#fefefe
| 365089 ||  || — || January 31, 2009 || Mount Lemmon || Mount Lemmon Survey || — || align=right data-sort-value="0.71" | 710 m || 
|-id=090 bgcolor=#fefefe
| 365090 ||  || — || January 29, 2009 || Mount Lemmon || Mount Lemmon Survey || SUL || align=right | 1.8 km || 
|-id=091 bgcolor=#fefefe
| 365091 ||  || — || January 31, 2009 || Kitt Peak || Spacewatch || FLO || align=right data-sort-value="0.77" | 770 m || 
|-id=092 bgcolor=#fefefe
| 365092 ||  || — || January 15, 2009 || Kitt Peak || Spacewatch || NYS || align=right data-sort-value="0.55" | 550 m || 
|-id=093 bgcolor=#fefefe
| 365093 ||  || — || January 31, 2009 || Mount Lemmon || Mount Lemmon Survey || — || align=right data-sort-value="0.90" | 900 m || 
|-id=094 bgcolor=#fefefe
| 365094 ||  || — || January 31, 2009 || Mount Lemmon || Mount Lemmon Survey || — || align=right data-sort-value="0.80" | 800 m || 
|-id=095 bgcolor=#fefefe
| 365095 ||  || — || January 30, 2009 || Kitt Peak || Spacewatch || NYS || align=right data-sort-value="0.60" | 600 m || 
|-id=096 bgcolor=#fefefe
| 365096 ||  || — || January 30, 2009 || Kitt Peak || Spacewatch || — || align=right data-sort-value="0.77" | 770 m || 
|-id=097 bgcolor=#fefefe
| 365097 ||  || — || January 31, 2009 || Kitt Peak || Spacewatch || NYS || align=right data-sort-value="0.59" | 590 m || 
|-id=098 bgcolor=#fefefe
| 365098 ||  || — || January 31, 2009 || Kitt Peak || Spacewatch || — || align=right data-sort-value="0.80" | 800 m || 
|-id=099 bgcolor=#fefefe
| 365099 ||  || — || January 31, 2009 || Kitt Peak || Spacewatch || MAS || align=right data-sort-value="0.66" | 660 m || 
|-id=100 bgcolor=#fefefe
| 365100 ||  || — || January 31, 2009 || Kitt Peak || Spacewatch || MAS || align=right data-sort-value="0.63" | 630 m || 
|}

365101–365200 

|-bgcolor=#fefefe
| 365101 ||  || — || January 31, 2009 || Kitt Peak || Spacewatch || NYS || align=right data-sort-value="0.59" | 590 m || 
|-id=102 bgcolor=#fefefe
| 365102 ||  || — || January 20, 2009 || Kitt Peak || Spacewatch || — || align=right data-sort-value="0.73" | 730 m || 
|-id=103 bgcolor=#fefefe
| 365103 ||  || — || January 17, 2009 || Kitt Peak || Spacewatch || NYS || align=right data-sort-value="0.53" | 530 m || 
|-id=104 bgcolor=#fefefe
| 365104 ||  || — || January 29, 2009 || Mount Lemmon || Mount Lemmon Survey || — || align=right data-sort-value="0.79" | 790 m || 
|-id=105 bgcolor=#fefefe
| 365105 ||  || — || January 30, 2009 || Mount Lemmon || Mount Lemmon Survey || — || align=right data-sort-value="0.88" | 880 m || 
|-id=106 bgcolor=#fefefe
| 365106 ||  || — || January 17, 2009 || Kitt Peak || Spacewatch || NYS || align=right | 1.7 km || 
|-id=107 bgcolor=#E9E9E9
| 365107 ||  || — || January 20, 2009 || Mount Lemmon || Mount Lemmon Survey || — || align=right | 2.8 km || 
|-id=108 bgcolor=#fefefe
| 365108 ||  || — || January 17, 2009 || Kitt Peak || Spacewatch || — || align=right data-sort-value="0.79" | 790 m || 
|-id=109 bgcolor=#fefefe
| 365109 ||  || — || February 1, 2009 || Kitt Peak || Spacewatch || — || align=right data-sort-value="0.90" | 900 m || 
|-id=110 bgcolor=#fefefe
| 365110 ||  || — || February 2, 2009 || Mount Lemmon || Mount Lemmon Survey || FLO || align=right data-sort-value="0.67" | 670 m || 
|-id=111 bgcolor=#fefefe
| 365111 ||  || — || February 3, 2009 || Mount Lemmon || Mount Lemmon Survey || FLO || align=right data-sort-value="0.65" | 650 m || 
|-id=112 bgcolor=#fefefe
| 365112 ||  || — || November 24, 2008 || Mount Lemmon || Mount Lemmon Survey || V || align=right data-sort-value="0.67" | 670 m || 
|-id=113 bgcolor=#fefefe
| 365113 ||  || — || February 1, 2009 || Kitt Peak || Spacewatch || — || align=right data-sort-value="0.80" | 800 m || 
|-id=114 bgcolor=#fefefe
| 365114 ||  || — || February 14, 2009 || Kitt Peak || Spacewatch || — || align=right data-sort-value="0.82" | 820 m || 
|-id=115 bgcolor=#fefefe
| 365115 ||  || — || February 14, 2009 || Kitt Peak || Spacewatch || — || align=right data-sort-value="0.52" | 520 m || 
|-id=116 bgcolor=#fefefe
| 365116 ||  || — || February 14, 2009 || Kitt Peak || Spacewatch || V || align=right data-sort-value="0.90" | 900 m || 
|-id=117 bgcolor=#fefefe
| 365117 ||  || — || December 30, 2008 || Mount Lemmon || Mount Lemmon Survey || NYS || align=right data-sort-value="0.87" | 870 m || 
|-id=118 bgcolor=#fefefe
| 365118 ||  || — || February 3, 2009 || Mount Lemmon || Mount Lemmon Survey || NYS || align=right data-sort-value="0.59" | 590 m || 
|-id=119 bgcolor=#fefefe
| 365119 ||  || — || February 1, 2009 || Mount Lemmon || Mount Lemmon Survey || NYS || align=right data-sort-value="0.70" | 700 m || 
|-id=120 bgcolor=#fefefe
| 365120 ||  || — || February 3, 2009 || Kitt Peak || Spacewatch || FLO || align=right data-sort-value="0.66" | 660 m || 
|-id=121 bgcolor=#fefefe
| 365121 ||  || — || February 1, 2009 || Catalina || CSS || FLO || align=right data-sort-value="0.67" | 670 m || 
|-id=122 bgcolor=#fefefe
| 365122 ||  || — || February 1, 2009 || Kitt Peak || Spacewatch || NYS || align=right data-sort-value="0.70" | 700 m || 
|-id=123 bgcolor=#fefefe
| 365123 ||  || — || February 5, 2009 || Kitt Peak || Spacewatch || — || align=right data-sort-value="0.71" | 710 m || 
|-id=124 bgcolor=#fefefe
| 365124 ||  || — || February 16, 2009 || Dauban || F. Kugel || — || align=right data-sort-value="0.77" | 770 m || 
|-id=125 bgcolor=#fefefe
| 365125 ||  || — || February 19, 2009 || Kitt Peak || Spacewatch || MAS || align=right data-sort-value="0.78" | 780 m || 
|-id=126 bgcolor=#fefefe
| 365126 ||  || — || February 19, 2009 || Mount Lemmon || Mount Lemmon Survey || — || align=right data-sort-value="0.81" | 810 m || 
|-id=127 bgcolor=#fefefe
| 365127 ||  || — || February 17, 2009 || La Sagra || OAM Obs. || — || align=right data-sort-value="0.85" | 850 m || 
|-id=128 bgcolor=#fefefe
| 365128 ||  || — || February 19, 2009 || Kitt Peak || Spacewatch || FLO || align=right data-sort-value="0.62" | 620 m || 
|-id=129 bgcolor=#fefefe
| 365129 ||  || — || February 19, 2009 || Kitt Peak || Spacewatch || — || align=right data-sort-value="0.74" | 740 m || 
|-id=130 bgcolor=#fefefe
| 365130 Birnfeld ||  ||  || February 23, 2009 || Calar Alto || F. Hormuth || — || align=right data-sort-value="0.79" | 790 m || 
|-id=131 bgcolor=#fefefe
| 365131 Hassberge ||  ||  || February 23, 2009 || Calar Alto || F. Hormuth || — || align=right data-sort-value="0.85" | 850 m || 
|-id=132 bgcolor=#fefefe
| 365132 ||  || — || February 20, 2009 || Kitt Peak || Spacewatch || — || align=right data-sort-value="0.80" | 800 m || 
|-id=133 bgcolor=#fefefe
| 365133 ||  || — || February 20, 2009 || Kitt Peak || Spacewatch || — || align=right data-sort-value="0.81" | 810 m || 
|-id=134 bgcolor=#fefefe
| 365134 ||  || — || February 22, 2009 || Mount Lemmon || Mount Lemmon Survey || — || align=right data-sort-value="0.77" | 770 m || 
|-id=135 bgcolor=#fefefe
| 365135 ||  || — || February 22, 2009 || Kitt Peak || Spacewatch || V || align=right data-sort-value="0.55" | 550 m || 
|-id=136 bgcolor=#fefefe
| 365136 ||  || — || February 27, 2009 || Mayhill || A. Lowe || — || align=right data-sort-value="0.89" | 890 m || 
|-id=137 bgcolor=#fefefe
| 365137 ||  || — || February 22, 2009 || Kitt Peak || Spacewatch || — || align=right data-sort-value="0.61" | 610 m || 
|-id=138 bgcolor=#fefefe
| 365138 ||  || — || February 22, 2009 || Kitt Peak || Spacewatch || — || align=right data-sort-value="0.75" | 750 m || 
|-id=139 bgcolor=#fefefe
| 365139 ||  || — || February 22, 2009 || Kitt Peak || Spacewatch || — || align=right data-sort-value="0.69" | 690 m || 
|-id=140 bgcolor=#fefefe
| 365140 ||  || — || February 22, 2009 || Kitt Peak || Spacewatch || MAS || align=right data-sort-value="0.83" | 830 m || 
|-id=141 bgcolor=#fefefe
| 365141 ||  || — || February 22, 2009 || Kitt Peak || Spacewatch || MAS || align=right data-sort-value="0.69" | 690 m || 
|-id=142 bgcolor=#fefefe
| 365142 ||  || — || February 22, 2009 || Kitt Peak || Spacewatch || NYS || align=right data-sort-value="0.87" | 870 m || 
|-id=143 bgcolor=#fefefe
| 365143 ||  || — || February 22, 2009 || Kitt Peak || Spacewatch || NYS || align=right data-sort-value="0.59" | 590 m || 
|-id=144 bgcolor=#fefefe
| 365144 ||  || — || February 22, 2009 || Kitt Peak || Spacewatch || — || align=right data-sort-value="0.81" | 810 m || 
|-id=145 bgcolor=#fefefe
| 365145 ||  || — || February 22, 2009 || Kitt Peak || Spacewatch || NYS || align=right data-sort-value="0.62" | 620 m || 
|-id=146 bgcolor=#fefefe
| 365146 ||  || — || February 22, 2009 || Kitt Peak || Spacewatch || NYS || align=right data-sort-value="0.65" | 650 m || 
|-id=147 bgcolor=#fefefe
| 365147 ||  || — || February 22, 2009 || Kitt Peak || Spacewatch || — || align=right data-sort-value="0.90" | 900 m || 
|-id=148 bgcolor=#fefefe
| 365148 ||  || — || February 22, 2009 || Kitt Peak || Spacewatch || V || align=right data-sort-value="0.80" | 800 m || 
|-id=149 bgcolor=#fefefe
| 365149 ||  || — || February 26, 2009 || Catalina || CSS || MAS || align=right data-sort-value="0.72" | 720 m || 
|-id=150 bgcolor=#fefefe
| 365150 ||  || — || February 1, 2009 || Mount Lemmon || Mount Lemmon Survey || NYS || align=right data-sort-value="0.79" | 790 m || 
|-id=151 bgcolor=#E9E9E9
| 365151 ||  || — || February 26, 2009 || Kitt Peak || Spacewatch || EUN || align=right | 1.2 km || 
|-id=152 bgcolor=#fefefe
| 365152 ||  || — || February 19, 2009 || Kitt Peak || Spacewatch || NYS || align=right data-sort-value="0.67" | 670 m || 
|-id=153 bgcolor=#fefefe
| 365153 ||  || — || February 22, 2009 || Mount Lemmon || Mount Lemmon Survey || NYS || align=right data-sort-value="0.64" | 640 m || 
|-id=154 bgcolor=#fefefe
| 365154 ||  || — || February 1, 2005 || Catalina || CSS || — || align=right data-sort-value="0.96" | 960 m || 
|-id=155 bgcolor=#fefefe
| 365155 ||  || — || February 26, 2009 || Kitt Peak || Spacewatch || NYS || align=right data-sort-value="0.66" | 660 m || 
|-id=156 bgcolor=#fefefe
| 365156 ||  || — || February 26, 2009 || Kitt Peak || Spacewatch || — || align=right data-sort-value="0.76" | 760 m || 
|-id=157 bgcolor=#fefefe
| 365157 ||  || — || February 26, 2009 || Kitt Peak || Spacewatch || — || align=right data-sort-value="0.90" | 900 m || 
|-id=158 bgcolor=#fefefe
| 365158 ||  || — || February 26, 2009 || Kitt Peak || Spacewatch || — || align=right data-sort-value="0.93" | 930 m || 
|-id=159 bgcolor=#fefefe
| 365159 Garching ||  ||  || February 26, 2009 || Calar Alto || F. Hormuth || MAS || align=right data-sort-value="0.69" | 690 m || 
|-id=160 bgcolor=#fefefe
| 365160 ||  || — || February 27, 2009 || Kitt Peak || Spacewatch || V || align=right data-sort-value="0.50" | 500 m || 
|-id=161 bgcolor=#fefefe
| 365161 ||  || — || February 27, 2009 || Kitt Peak || Spacewatch || MAS || align=right data-sort-value="0.95" | 950 m || 
|-id=162 bgcolor=#fefefe
| 365162 ||  || — || May 26, 2006 || Mount Lemmon || Mount Lemmon Survey || NYS || align=right data-sort-value="0.81" | 810 m || 
|-id=163 bgcolor=#fefefe
| 365163 ||  || — || February 19, 2009 || Kitt Peak || Spacewatch || — || align=right data-sort-value="0.80" | 800 m || 
|-id=164 bgcolor=#fefefe
| 365164 ||  || — || February 20, 2009 || Kitt Peak || Spacewatch || — || align=right data-sort-value="0.81" | 810 m || 
|-id=165 bgcolor=#fefefe
| 365165 ||  || — || February 27, 2009 || Kitt Peak || Spacewatch || MAS || align=right data-sort-value="0.77" | 770 m || 
|-id=166 bgcolor=#fefefe
| 365166 ||  || — || February 27, 2009 || Kitt Peak || Spacewatch || NYS || align=right data-sort-value="0.68" | 680 m || 
|-id=167 bgcolor=#fefefe
| 365167 ||  || — || February 24, 2009 || Catalina || CSS || — || align=right data-sort-value="0.77" | 770 m || 
|-id=168 bgcolor=#fefefe
| 365168 ||  || — || February 20, 2009 || Kitt Peak || Spacewatch || NYS || align=right data-sort-value="0.67" | 670 m || 
|-id=169 bgcolor=#fefefe
| 365169 ||  || — || February 20, 2009 || Mount Lemmon || Mount Lemmon Survey || — || align=right | 1.0 km || 
|-id=170 bgcolor=#fefefe
| 365170 ||  || — || February 26, 2009 || Kitt Peak || Spacewatch || NYS || align=right data-sort-value="0.69" | 690 m || 
|-id=171 bgcolor=#fefefe
| 365171 ||  || — || February 20, 2009 || Socorro || LINEAR || V || align=right data-sort-value="0.90" | 900 m || 
|-id=172 bgcolor=#fefefe
| 365172 ||  || — || February 20, 2009 || Kitt Peak || Spacewatch || — || align=right data-sort-value="0.70" | 700 m || 
|-id=173 bgcolor=#fefefe
| 365173 ||  || — || February 4, 2009 || Mount Lemmon || Mount Lemmon Survey || NYS || align=right data-sort-value="0.58" | 580 m || 
|-id=174 bgcolor=#fefefe
| 365174 ||  || — || March 13, 2009 || La Sagra || OAM Obs. || — || align=right | 1.0 km || 
|-id=175 bgcolor=#fefefe
| 365175 ||  || — || March 1, 2009 || Kitt Peak || Spacewatch || NYS || align=right data-sort-value="0.65" | 650 m || 
|-id=176 bgcolor=#fefefe
| 365176 ||  || — || March 7, 2009 || Mount Lemmon || Mount Lemmon Survey || NYS || align=right data-sort-value="0.73" | 730 m || 
|-id=177 bgcolor=#fefefe
| 365177 ||  || — || March 16, 2009 || La Sagra || OAM Obs. || — || align=right data-sort-value="0.94" | 940 m || 
|-id=178 bgcolor=#fefefe
| 365178 ||  || — || February 19, 2009 || Kitt Peak || Spacewatch || NYS || align=right data-sort-value="0.61" | 610 m || 
|-id=179 bgcolor=#FA8072
| 365179 ||  || — || March 19, 2009 || Mount Lemmon || Mount Lemmon Survey || — || align=right | 1.8 km || 
|-id=180 bgcolor=#fefefe
| 365180 ||  || — || March 16, 2009 || Kitt Peak || Spacewatch || NYS || align=right data-sort-value="0.54" | 540 m || 
|-id=181 bgcolor=#fefefe
| 365181 ||  || — || March 16, 2009 || Mount Lemmon || Mount Lemmon Survey || — || align=right data-sort-value="0.83" | 830 m || 
|-id=182 bgcolor=#fefefe
| 365182 ||  || — || January 15, 2005 || Kitt Peak || Spacewatch || — || align=right | 1.1 km || 
|-id=183 bgcolor=#fefefe
| 365183 ||  || — || March 21, 2009 || Mount Lemmon || Mount Lemmon Survey || MAS || align=right data-sort-value="0.86" | 860 m || 
|-id=184 bgcolor=#fefefe
| 365184 ||  || — || February 24, 2009 || Catalina || CSS || — || align=right | 1.1 km || 
|-id=185 bgcolor=#fefefe
| 365185 ||  || — || March 17, 2009 || Kitt Peak || Spacewatch || — || align=right data-sort-value="0.91" | 910 m || 
|-id=186 bgcolor=#fefefe
| 365186 ||  || — || March 22, 2009 || Taunus || R. Kling, U. Zimmer || — || align=right | 1.5 km || 
|-id=187 bgcolor=#fefefe
| 365187 ||  || — || February 20, 2009 || Mount Lemmon || Mount Lemmon Survey || — || align=right data-sort-value="0.69" | 690 m || 
|-id=188 bgcolor=#fefefe
| 365188 ||  || — || March 21, 2009 || Catalina || CSS || — || align=right data-sort-value="0.79" | 790 m || 
|-id=189 bgcolor=#fefefe
| 365189 ||  || — || March 22, 2009 || Mount Lemmon || Mount Lemmon Survey || NYS || align=right data-sort-value="0.69" | 690 m || 
|-id=190 bgcolor=#fefefe
| 365190 Kenting ||  ||  || March 22, 2009 || Lulin Observatory || Y.-S. Tsai || NYS || align=right data-sort-value="0.66" | 660 m || 
|-id=191 bgcolor=#fefefe
| 365191 ||  || — || March 17, 2009 || Kitt Peak || Spacewatch || FLO || align=right data-sort-value="0.56" | 560 m || 
|-id=192 bgcolor=#fefefe
| 365192 ||  || — || March 24, 2009 || Kitt Peak || Spacewatch || V || align=right data-sort-value="0.76" | 760 m || 
|-id=193 bgcolor=#fefefe
| 365193 ||  || — || November 7, 2007 || Mount Lemmon || Mount Lemmon Survey || NYS || align=right data-sort-value="0.72" | 720 m || 
|-id=194 bgcolor=#fefefe
| 365194 ||  || — || March 21, 2009 || Catalina || CSS || NYS || align=right data-sort-value="0.79" | 790 m || 
|-id=195 bgcolor=#fefefe
| 365195 ||  || — || March 20, 2009 || La Sagra || OAM Obs. || V || align=right data-sort-value="0.60" | 600 m || 
|-id=196 bgcolor=#fefefe
| 365196 ||  || — || March 19, 2009 || Kitt Peak || Spacewatch || — || align=right data-sort-value="0.63" | 630 m || 
|-id=197 bgcolor=#fefefe
| 365197 ||  || — || March 29, 2009 || Mount Lemmon || Mount Lemmon Survey || — || align=right data-sort-value="0.85" | 850 m || 
|-id=198 bgcolor=#fefefe
| 365198 ||  || — || March 29, 2009 || Mount Lemmon || Mount Lemmon Survey || — || align=right | 1.0 km || 
|-id=199 bgcolor=#E9E9E9
| 365199 ||  || — || March 19, 2009 || Kitt Peak || Spacewatch || — || align=right | 1.0 km || 
|-id=200 bgcolor=#fefefe
| 365200 ||  || — || March 18, 2009 || Mount Lemmon || Mount Lemmon Survey || — || align=right data-sort-value="0.87" | 870 m || 
|}

365201–365300 

|-bgcolor=#fefefe
| 365201 ||  || — || March 18, 2009 || Socorro || LINEAR || V || align=right data-sort-value="0.86" | 860 m || 
|-id=202 bgcolor=#fefefe
| 365202 ||  || — || March 24, 2009 || Mount Lemmon || Mount Lemmon Survey || V || align=right data-sort-value="0.76" | 760 m || 
|-id=203 bgcolor=#fefefe
| 365203 ||  || — || April 1, 2009 || Catalina || CSS || V || align=right data-sort-value="0.68" | 680 m || 
|-id=204 bgcolor=#fefefe
| 365204 ||  || — || April 2, 2009 || Mount Lemmon || Mount Lemmon Survey || — || align=right | 1.3 km || 
|-id=205 bgcolor=#fefefe
| 365205 ||  || — || April 17, 2009 || Catalina || CSS || — || align=right | 1.0 km || 
|-id=206 bgcolor=#fefefe
| 365206 ||  || — || April 17, 2009 || Kitt Peak || Spacewatch || V || align=right data-sort-value="0.68" | 680 m || 
|-id=207 bgcolor=#fefefe
| 365207 ||  || — || March 17, 2009 || Kitt Peak || Spacewatch || FLO || align=right data-sort-value="0.77" | 770 m || 
|-id=208 bgcolor=#fefefe
| 365208 ||  || — || April 17, 2009 || Kitt Peak || Spacewatch || — || align=right data-sort-value="0.75" | 750 m || 
|-id=209 bgcolor=#E9E9E9
| 365209 ||  || — || April 17, 2009 || Kitt Peak || Spacewatch || — || align=right | 1.1 km || 
|-id=210 bgcolor=#fefefe
| 365210 ||  || — || April 18, 2009 || Piszkéstető || K. Sárneczky || MAS || align=right data-sort-value="0.72" | 720 m || 
|-id=211 bgcolor=#fefefe
| 365211 ||  || — || April 18, 2009 || Kitt Peak || Spacewatch || — || align=right | 1.1 km || 
|-id=212 bgcolor=#fefefe
| 365212 ||  || — || April 18, 2009 || Kitt Peak || Spacewatch || — || align=right | 1.2 km || 
|-id=213 bgcolor=#E9E9E9
| 365213 ||  || — || April 19, 2009 || Catalina || CSS || — || align=right | 1.1 km || 
|-id=214 bgcolor=#fefefe
| 365214 ||  || — || April 20, 2009 || Kitt Peak || Spacewatch || NYS || align=right data-sort-value="0.79" | 790 m || 
|-id=215 bgcolor=#d6d6d6
| 365215 ||  || — || April 18, 2009 || Kitt Peak || Spacewatch || BRA || align=right | 1.7 km || 
|-id=216 bgcolor=#fefefe
| 365216 ||  || — || April 20, 2009 || Kitt Peak || Spacewatch || — || align=right data-sort-value="0.94" | 940 m || 
|-id=217 bgcolor=#fefefe
| 365217 ||  || — || April 19, 2009 || Kitt Peak || Spacewatch || — || align=right | 1.1 km || 
|-id=218 bgcolor=#E9E9E9
| 365218 ||  || — || April 19, 2009 || Kitt Peak || Spacewatch || EUN || align=right | 1.5 km || 
|-id=219 bgcolor=#E9E9E9
| 365219 ||  || — || April 20, 2009 || Purple Mountain || PMO NEO || HNS || align=right | 1.2 km || 
|-id=220 bgcolor=#fefefe
| 365220 ||  || — || April 29, 2009 || Mount Lemmon || Mount Lemmon Survey || — || align=right data-sort-value="0.82" | 820 m || 
|-id=221 bgcolor=#E9E9E9
| 365221 ||  || — || April 24, 2009 || Cerro Burek || Alianza S4 Obs. || — || align=right | 1.0 km || 
|-id=222 bgcolor=#E9E9E9
| 365222 ||  || — || April 23, 2009 || Kitt Peak || Spacewatch || — || align=right | 1.6 km || 
|-id=223 bgcolor=#fefefe
| 365223 ||  || — || April 19, 2009 || Kitt Peak || Spacewatch || — || align=right | 1.3 km || 
|-id=224 bgcolor=#FA8072
| 365224 ||  || — || April 28, 2009 || Catalina || CSS || — || align=right | 2.5 km || 
|-id=225 bgcolor=#fefefe
| 365225 ||  || — || April 18, 2009 || Mount Lemmon || Mount Lemmon Survey || MAS || align=right data-sort-value="0.80" | 800 m || 
|-id=226 bgcolor=#fefefe
| 365226 ||  || — || April 27, 2009 || Purple Mountain || PMO NEO || — || align=right data-sort-value="0.81" | 810 m || 
|-id=227 bgcolor=#E9E9E9
| 365227 ||  || — || April 29, 2009 || Kitt Peak || Spacewatch || — || align=right | 1.6 km || 
|-id=228 bgcolor=#fefefe
| 365228 ||  || — || April 22, 2009 || Mount Lemmon || Mount Lemmon Survey || LCI || align=right | 1.1 km || 
|-id=229 bgcolor=#d6d6d6
| 365229 ||  || — || April 17, 2009 || Kitt Peak || Spacewatch || — || align=right | 2.4 km || 
|-id=230 bgcolor=#E9E9E9
| 365230 ||  || — || April 19, 2009 || Siding Spring || SSS || — || align=right | 1.7 km || 
|-id=231 bgcolor=#E9E9E9
| 365231 ||  || — || April 27, 2009 || Kitt Peak || Spacewatch || — || align=right | 1.1 km || 
|-id=232 bgcolor=#E9E9E9
| 365232 ||  || — || April 20, 2009 || Kitt Peak || Spacewatch || — || align=right | 1.1 km || 
|-id=233 bgcolor=#E9E9E9
| 365233 ||  || — || April 17, 2009 || Kitt Peak || Spacewatch || — || align=right | 1.0 km || 
|-id=234 bgcolor=#E9E9E9
| 365234 ||  || — || April 26, 2009 || Siding Spring || SSS || — || align=right | 1.2 km || 
|-id=235 bgcolor=#fefefe
| 365235 ||  || — || April 20, 2009 || XuYi || PMO NEO || — || align=right data-sort-value="0.87" | 870 m || 
|-id=236 bgcolor=#E9E9E9
| 365236 ||  || — || June 27, 2001 || Palomar || NEAT || — || align=right | 1.9 km || 
|-id=237 bgcolor=#E9E9E9
| 365237 ||  || — || May 14, 2009 || Kitt Peak || Spacewatch || — || align=right | 1.1 km || 
|-id=238 bgcolor=#E9E9E9
| 365238 ||  || — || May 1, 2009 || Mount Lemmon || Mount Lemmon Survey || — || align=right | 1.0 km || 
|-id=239 bgcolor=#E9E9E9
| 365239 ||  || — || March 15, 2004 || Kitt Peak || Spacewatch || — || align=right | 1.2 km || 
|-id=240 bgcolor=#E9E9E9
| 365240 ||  || — || May 31, 2009 || Bisei SG Center || BATTeRS || BAR || align=right | 1.6 km || 
|-id=241 bgcolor=#E9E9E9
| 365241 ||  || — || October 16, 2006 || Catalina || CSS || — || align=right | 1.9 km || 
|-id=242 bgcolor=#E9E9E9
| 365242 ||  || — || June 21, 2009 || Kitt Peak || Spacewatch || — || align=right | 1.6 km || 
|-id=243 bgcolor=#E9E9E9
| 365243 ||  || — || June 25, 2009 || Tzec Maun || E. Schwab || EUN || align=right | 1.4 km || 
|-id=244 bgcolor=#E9E9E9
| 365244 ||  || — || June 27, 2009 || La Sagra || OAM Obs. || JUN || align=right | 1.1 km || 
|-id=245 bgcolor=#E9E9E9
| 365245 ||  || — || June 23, 2009 || Mount Lemmon || Mount Lemmon Survey || — || align=right data-sort-value="0.91" | 910 m || 
|-id=246 bgcolor=#FFC2E0
| 365246 ||  || — || July 2, 2009 || Socorro || LINEAR || APO +1km || align=right | 2.3 km || 
|-id=247 bgcolor=#E9E9E9
| 365247 ||  || — || July 14, 2009 || La Sagra || OAM Obs. || — || align=right | 2.2 km || 
|-id=248 bgcolor=#E9E9E9
| 365248 ||  || — || October 5, 2005 || Catalina || CSS || — || align=right | 3.1 km || 
|-id=249 bgcolor=#E9E9E9
| 365249 ||  || — || July 26, 2009 || La Sagra || OAM Obs. || — || align=right | 2.8 km || 
|-id=250 bgcolor=#E9E9E9
| 365250 Vladimirsurdin ||  ||  || July 26, 2009 || Zelenchukskaya || T. V. Kryachko || — || align=right | 2.7 km || 
|-id=251 bgcolor=#d6d6d6
| 365251 ||  || — || July 28, 2009 || Hibiscus || N. Teamo || — || align=right | 3.7 km || 
|-id=252 bgcolor=#E9E9E9
| 365252 ||  || — || July 28, 2009 || Kitt Peak || Spacewatch || — || align=right | 2.1 km || 
|-id=253 bgcolor=#E9E9E9
| 365253 ||  || — || July 28, 2009 || Kitt Peak || Spacewatch || — || align=right | 2.2 km || 
|-id=254 bgcolor=#E9E9E9
| 365254 ||  || — || July 28, 2009 || Kitt Peak || Spacewatch || — || align=right | 1.7 km || 
|-id=255 bgcolor=#E9E9E9
| 365255 ||  || — || July 29, 2009 || Kitt Peak || Spacewatch || — || align=right | 2.5 km || 
|-id=256 bgcolor=#d6d6d6
| 365256 ||  || — || May 13, 2008 || Kitt Peak || Spacewatch || — || align=right | 2.6 km || 
|-id=257 bgcolor=#d6d6d6
| 365257 ||  || — || August 13, 2009 || Dauban || F. Kugel || — || align=right | 3.9 km || 
|-id=258 bgcolor=#E9E9E9
| 365258 ||  || — || August 12, 2009 || La Sagra || OAM Obs. || JUN || align=right | 1.0 km || 
|-id=259 bgcolor=#d6d6d6
| 365259 ||  || — || July 29, 2009 || Kitt Peak || Spacewatch || — || align=right | 3.6 km || 
|-id=260 bgcolor=#d6d6d6
| 365260 ||  || — || August 15, 2009 || Catalina || CSS || — || align=right | 3.8 km || 
|-id=261 bgcolor=#d6d6d6
| 365261 ||  || — || August 15, 2009 || Kitt Peak || Spacewatch || — || align=right | 3.9 km || 
|-id=262 bgcolor=#d6d6d6
| 365262 ||  || — || August 18, 2003 || Haleakala || NEAT || — || align=right | 4.1 km || 
|-id=263 bgcolor=#E9E9E9
| 365263 || 2009 QY || — || August 16, 2009 || Marly || P. Kocher || — || align=right | 2.6 km || 
|-id=264 bgcolor=#d6d6d6
| 365264 ||  || — || August 16, 2009 || La Sagra || OAM Obs. || — || align=right | 3.3 km || 
|-id=265 bgcolor=#d6d6d6
| 365265 ||  || — || August 16, 2009 || La Sagra || OAM Obs. || — || align=right | 2.6 km || 
|-id=266 bgcolor=#d6d6d6
| 365266 ||  || — || August 18, 2009 || Kitt Peak || Spacewatch || THM || align=right | 2.9 km || 
|-id=267 bgcolor=#d6d6d6
| 365267 ||  || — || August 20, 2009 || Črni Vrh || Črni Vrh || — || align=right | 3.0 km || 
|-id=268 bgcolor=#d6d6d6
| 365268 ||  || — || August 16, 2009 || Kitt Peak || Spacewatch || — || align=right | 3.2 km || 
|-id=269 bgcolor=#E9E9E9
| 365269 ||  || — || August 16, 2009 || Kitt Peak || Spacewatch || TIN || align=right | 1.1 km || 
|-id=270 bgcolor=#d6d6d6
| 365270 ||  || — || August 20, 2009 || La Sagra || OAM Obs. || — || align=right | 2.9 km || 
|-id=271 bgcolor=#d6d6d6
| 365271 ||  || — || August 23, 2009 || Dauban || F. Kugel || — || align=right | 3.1 km || 
|-id=272 bgcolor=#d6d6d6
| 365272 ||  || — || April 4, 2008 || Mount Lemmon || Mount Lemmon Survey || BRA || align=right | 2.1 km || 
|-id=273 bgcolor=#d6d6d6
| 365273 ||  || — || August 23, 2009 || Hibiscus || N. Teamo || — || align=right | 2.2 km || 
|-id=274 bgcolor=#d6d6d6
| 365274 ||  || — || August 30, 2009 || Taunus || S. Karge, R. Kling || — || align=right | 3.2 km || 
|-id=275 bgcolor=#d6d6d6
| 365275 ||  || — || August 28, 2009 || Catalina || CSS || EUP || align=right | 4.9 km || 
|-id=276 bgcolor=#d6d6d6
| 365276 ||  || — || August 26, 2009 || La Sagra || OAM Obs. || — || align=right | 3.4 km || 
|-id=277 bgcolor=#d6d6d6
| 365277 ||  || — || August 26, 2009 || La Sagra || OAM Obs. || HYG || align=right | 3.2 km || 
|-id=278 bgcolor=#E9E9E9
| 365278 ||  || — || August 27, 2009 || La Sagra || OAM Obs. || — || align=right | 1.8 km || 
|-id=279 bgcolor=#E9E9E9
| 365279 ||  || — || August 26, 2009 || Catalina || CSS || MRX || align=right | 1.3 km || 
|-id=280 bgcolor=#d6d6d6
| 365280 ||  || — || August 16, 2009 || Kitt Peak || Spacewatch || — || align=right | 2.8 km || 
|-id=281 bgcolor=#d6d6d6
| 365281 ||  || — || August 16, 2009 || Kitt Peak || Spacewatch || — || align=right | 3.0 km || 
|-id=282 bgcolor=#d6d6d6
| 365282 ||  || — || August 20, 2009 || Kitt Peak || Spacewatch || EOS || align=right | 2.0 km || 
|-id=283 bgcolor=#d6d6d6
| 365283 ||  || — || August 27, 2009 || Kitt Peak || Spacewatch || — || align=right | 2.9 km || 
|-id=284 bgcolor=#d6d6d6
| 365284 ||  || — || October 12, 2004 || Kitt Peak || Spacewatch || — || align=right | 2.9 km || 
|-id=285 bgcolor=#d6d6d6
| 365285 ||  || — || September 10, 2009 || Catalina || CSS || LIX || align=right | 4.3 km || 
|-id=286 bgcolor=#d6d6d6
| 365286 ||  || — || September 12, 2009 || Kitt Peak || Spacewatch || — || align=right | 3.3 km || 
|-id=287 bgcolor=#d6d6d6
| 365287 ||  || — || September 12, 2009 || Kitt Peak || Spacewatch || — || align=right | 3.4 km || 
|-id=288 bgcolor=#d6d6d6
| 365288 ||  || — || September 12, 2009 || Kitt Peak || Spacewatch || EOS || align=right | 2.1 km || 
|-id=289 bgcolor=#d6d6d6
| 365289 ||  || — || September 12, 2009 || Kitt Peak || Spacewatch || — || align=right | 3.3 km || 
|-id=290 bgcolor=#E9E9E9
| 365290 ||  || — || September 15, 2009 || Kitt Peak || Spacewatch || DOR || align=right | 2.9 km || 
|-id=291 bgcolor=#d6d6d6
| 365291 ||  || — || September 13, 2009 || ESA OGS || ESA OGS || — || align=right | 3.7 km || 
|-id=292 bgcolor=#d6d6d6
| 365292 ||  || — || September 11, 2009 || Catalina || CSS || — || align=right | 4.2 km || 
|-id=293 bgcolor=#d6d6d6
| 365293 ||  || — || August 23, 2003 || Palomar || NEAT || HYG || align=right | 2.8 km || 
|-id=294 bgcolor=#d6d6d6
| 365294 ||  || — || September 15, 2009 || Kitt Peak || Spacewatch || — || align=right | 3.4 km || 
|-id=295 bgcolor=#d6d6d6
| 365295 ||  || — || September 15, 2009 || Kitt Peak || Spacewatch || — || align=right | 4.5 km || 
|-id=296 bgcolor=#d6d6d6
| 365296 ||  || — || September 15, 2009 || Kitt Peak || Spacewatch || — || align=right | 4.0 km || 
|-id=297 bgcolor=#d6d6d6
| 365297 ||  || — || September 15, 2009 || Kitt Peak || Spacewatch || THM || align=right | 2.4 km || 
|-id=298 bgcolor=#d6d6d6
| 365298 ||  || — || September 15, 2009 || Kitt Peak || Spacewatch || — || align=right | 2.9 km || 
|-id=299 bgcolor=#d6d6d6
| 365299 ||  || — || September 15, 2009 || Kitt Peak || Spacewatch || — || align=right | 3.9 km || 
|-id=300 bgcolor=#d6d6d6
| 365300 ||  || — || September 15, 2009 || Kitt Peak || Spacewatch || — || align=right | 2.7 km || 
|}

365301–365400 

|-bgcolor=#C2FFFF
| 365301 ||  || — || September 12, 2009 || Kitt Peak || Spacewatch || L4 || align=right | 7.6 km || 
|-id=302 bgcolor=#d6d6d6
| 365302 ||  || — || September 14, 2009 || La Sagra || OAM Obs. || — || align=right | 3.5 km || 
|-id=303 bgcolor=#d6d6d6
| 365303 ||  || — || September 15, 2009 || Kitt Peak || Spacewatch || — || align=right | 2.7 km || 
|-id=304 bgcolor=#d6d6d6
| 365304 ||  || — || September 15, 2009 || Kitt Peak || Spacewatch || MEL || align=right | 4.3 km || 
|-id=305 bgcolor=#d6d6d6
| 365305 ||  || — || September 15, 2009 || Kitt Peak || Spacewatch || HYG || align=right | 2.5 km || 
|-id=306 bgcolor=#d6d6d6
| 365306 ||  || — || September 15, 2009 || Kitt Peak || Spacewatch || — || align=right | 3.2 km || 
|-id=307 bgcolor=#d6d6d6
| 365307 ||  || — || September 16, 2009 || Mount Lemmon || Mount Lemmon Survey || — || align=right | 2.7 km || 
|-id=308 bgcolor=#d6d6d6
| 365308 ||  || — || September 16, 2009 || Mount Lemmon || Mount Lemmon Survey || — || align=right | 3.5 km || 
|-id=309 bgcolor=#d6d6d6
| 365309 ||  || — || September 21, 2009 || Črni Vrh || Črni Vrh || — || align=right | 3.8 km || 
|-id=310 bgcolor=#d6d6d6
| 365310 ||  || — || September 16, 2009 || Kitt Peak || Spacewatch || — || align=right | 3.3 km || 
|-id=311 bgcolor=#d6d6d6
| 365311 ||  || — || September 16, 2009 || Kitt Peak || Spacewatch || — || align=right | 2.1 km || 
|-id=312 bgcolor=#d6d6d6
| 365312 ||  || — || September 16, 2009 || Kitt Peak || Spacewatch || — || align=right | 3.1 km || 
|-id=313 bgcolor=#d6d6d6
| 365313 ||  || — || September 16, 2009 || Kitt Peak || Spacewatch || SYL7:4 || align=right | 4.0 km || 
|-id=314 bgcolor=#d6d6d6
| 365314 ||  || — || September 17, 2009 || Kitt Peak || Spacewatch || URS || align=right | 4.8 km || 
|-id=315 bgcolor=#d6d6d6
| 365315 ||  || — || September 17, 2009 || Kitt Peak || Spacewatch || — || align=right | 2.9 km || 
|-id=316 bgcolor=#d6d6d6
| 365316 ||  || — || September 17, 2009 || Mount Lemmon || Mount Lemmon Survey || — || align=right | 2.7 km || 
|-id=317 bgcolor=#d6d6d6
| 365317 ||  || — || August 15, 2009 || Kitt Peak || Spacewatch || — || align=right | 2.7 km || 
|-id=318 bgcolor=#d6d6d6
| 365318 ||  || — || September 18, 2009 || Kitt Peak || Spacewatch || — || align=right | 2.8 km || 
|-id=319 bgcolor=#d6d6d6
| 365319 ||  || — || September 21, 2009 || La Sagra || OAM Obs. || — || align=right | 3.2 km || 
|-id=320 bgcolor=#E9E9E9
| 365320 ||  || — || September 17, 2009 || Catalina || CSS || — || align=right | 2.9 km || 
|-id=321 bgcolor=#d6d6d6
| 365321 ||  || — || September 18, 2009 || Kitt Peak || Spacewatch || — || align=right | 2.9 km || 
|-id=322 bgcolor=#d6d6d6
| 365322 ||  || — || July 3, 2003 || Kitt Peak || Spacewatch || HYG || align=right | 2.5 km || 
|-id=323 bgcolor=#d6d6d6
| 365323 ||  || — || September 18, 2009 || Kitt Peak || Spacewatch || — || align=right | 2.8 km || 
|-id=324 bgcolor=#d6d6d6
| 365324 ||  || — || September 18, 2009 || Kitt Peak || Spacewatch || VER || align=right | 3.5 km || 
|-id=325 bgcolor=#d6d6d6
| 365325 ||  || — || September 18, 2009 || Kitt Peak || Spacewatch || — || align=right | 2.5 km || 
|-id=326 bgcolor=#d6d6d6
| 365326 ||  || — || September 18, 2009 || Kitt Peak || Spacewatch || HYG || align=right | 3.6 km || 
|-id=327 bgcolor=#d6d6d6
| 365327 ||  || — || September 19, 2009 || Kitt Peak || Spacewatch || 7:4 || align=right | 3.9 km || 
|-id=328 bgcolor=#d6d6d6
| 365328 ||  || — || September 19, 2009 || Kitt Peak || Spacewatch || HYG || align=right | 2.7 km || 
|-id=329 bgcolor=#d6d6d6
| 365329 ||  || — || September 21, 2009 || Catalina || CSS || — || align=right | 2.9 km || 
|-id=330 bgcolor=#d6d6d6
| 365330 ||  || — || September 21, 2009 || Kitt Peak || Spacewatch || — || align=right | 3.8 km || 
|-id=331 bgcolor=#d6d6d6
| 365331 ||  || — || September 21, 2009 || Catalina || CSS || — || align=right | 3.0 km || 
|-id=332 bgcolor=#d6d6d6
| 365332 ||  || — || August 27, 2009 || Kitt Peak || Spacewatch || VER || align=right | 2.9 km || 
|-id=333 bgcolor=#d6d6d6
| 365333 ||  || — || September 21, 2009 || La Sagra || OAM Obs. || — || align=right | 3.8 km || 
|-id=334 bgcolor=#E9E9E9
| 365334 ||  || — || December 11, 2005 || La Silla || R. Behrend || MRX || align=right data-sort-value="0.94" | 940 m || 
|-id=335 bgcolor=#d6d6d6
| 365335 ||  || — || September 23, 2009 || Kitt Peak || Spacewatch || EOS || align=right | 1.9 km || 
|-id=336 bgcolor=#d6d6d6
| 365336 ||  || — || September 24, 2009 || Kitt Peak || Spacewatch || — || align=right | 2.8 km || 
|-id=337 bgcolor=#d6d6d6
| 365337 ||  || — || September 24, 2009 || Kitt Peak || Spacewatch || — || align=right | 2.8 km || 
|-id=338 bgcolor=#d6d6d6
| 365338 ||  || — || September 24, 2009 || Kitt Peak || Spacewatch || — || align=right | 3.7 km || 
|-id=339 bgcolor=#d6d6d6
| 365339 ||  || — || September 25, 2009 || Mount Lemmon || Mount Lemmon Survey || EOS || align=right | 2.5 km || 
|-id=340 bgcolor=#E9E9E9
| 365340 ||  || — || September 26, 2009 || Mount Lemmon || Mount Lemmon Survey || — || align=right | 3.1 km || 
|-id=341 bgcolor=#E9E9E9
| 365341 ||  || — || August 17, 2009 || Catalina || CSS || — || align=right | 3.0 km || 
|-id=342 bgcolor=#E9E9E9
| 365342 ||  || — || September 25, 2009 || La Sagra || OAM Obs. || ADE || align=right | 2.2 km || 
|-id=343 bgcolor=#E9E9E9
| 365343 ||  || — || September 16, 2009 || Siding Spring || SSS || — || align=right | 2.1 km || 
|-id=344 bgcolor=#E9E9E9
| 365344 ||  || — || September 16, 2009 || Siding Spring || SSS || BAR || align=right | 1.7 km || 
|-id=345 bgcolor=#d6d6d6
| 365345 ||  || — || September 23, 2009 || Mount Lemmon || Mount Lemmon Survey || ELF || align=right | 3.3 km || 
|-id=346 bgcolor=#d6d6d6
| 365346 ||  || — || February 17, 2007 || Kitt Peak || Spacewatch || — || align=right | 2.8 km || 
|-id=347 bgcolor=#d6d6d6
| 365347 ||  || — || September 25, 2009 || Kitt Peak || Spacewatch || — || align=right | 2.6 km || 
|-id=348 bgcolor=#d6d6d6
| 365348 ||  || — || September 25, 2009 || Kitt Peak || Spacewatch || — || align=right | 3.0 km || 
|-id=349 bgcolor=#d6d6d6
| 365349 ||  || — || September 25, 2009 || Kitt Peak || Spacewatch || — || align=right | 2.9 km || 
|-id=350 bgcolor=#d6d6d6
| 365350 ||  || — || April 17, 1996 || La Silla || E. W. Elst || HYG || align=right | 3.6 km || 
|-id=351 bgcolor=#d6d6d6
| 365351 ||  || — || September 17, 2009 || Kitt Peak || Spacewatch || — || align=right | 3.0 km || 
|-id=352 bgcolor=#d6d6d6
| 365352 ||  || — || March 15, 2007 || Mount Lemmon || Mount Lemmon Survey || — || align=right | 3.7 km || 
|-id=353 bgcolor=#E9E9E9
| 365353 ||  || — || August 16, 2009 || Kitt Peak || Spacewatch || — || align=right | 2.0 km || 
|-id=354 bgcolor=#d6d6d6
| 365354 ||  || — || September 26, 2009 || Kitt Peak || Spacewatch || — || align=right | 3.5 km || 
|-id=355 bgcolor=#d6d6d6
| 365355 ||  || — || September 29, 2009 || Kitt Peak || Spacewatch || HYG || align=right | 3.0 km || 
|-id=356 bgcolor=#d6d6d6
| 365356 ||  || — || September 18, 2009 || Catalina || CSS || — || align=right | 4.7 km || 
|-id=357 bgcolor=#d6d6d6
| 365357 ||  || — || August 15, 2009 || Kitt Peak || Spacewatch || — || align=right | 4.2 km || 
|-id=358 bgcolor=#d6d6d6
| 365358 ||  || — || September 21, 2009 || Catalina || CSS || — || align=right | 4.0 km || 
|-id=359 bgcolor=#d6d6d6
| 365359 ||  || — || September 21, 2009 || Catalina || CSS || — || align=right | 4.2 km || 
|-id=360 bgcolor=#d6d6d6
| 365360 ||  || — || September 16, 2009 || Catalina || CSS || — || align=right | 4.5 km || 
|-id=361 bgcolor=#E9E9E9
| 365361 ||  || — || September 16, 2009 || Catalina || CSS || — || align=right | 3.3 km || 
|-id=362 bgcolor=#d6d6d6
| 365362 ||  || — || September 27, 2009 || Kitt Peak || Spacewatch || — || align=right | 2.8 km || 
|-id=363 bgcolor=#d6d6d6
| 365363 ||  || — || October 11, 2009 || La Sagra || OAM Obs. || — || align=right | 3.1 km || 
|-id=364 bgcolor=#d6d6d6
| 365364 ||  || — || October 15, 2009 || Bisei SG Center || BATTeRS || EOS || align=right | 2.1 km || 
|-id=365 bgcolor=#E9E9E9
| 365365 ||  || — || October 12, 2009 || La Sagra || OAM Obs. || — || align=right | 3.1 km || 
|-id=366 bgcolor=#d6d6d6
| 365366 ||  || — || October 14, 2009 || Kitt Peak || Spacewatch || THM || align=right | 2.3 km || 
|-id=367 bgcolor=#d6d6d6
| 365367 ||  || — || October 15, 2009 || Catalina || CSS || MEL || align=right | 4.5 km || 
|-id=368 bgcolor=#d6d6d6
| 365368 ||  || — || October 15, 2009 || Mount Lemmon || Mount Lemmon Survey || — || align=right | 3.6 km || 
|-id=369 bgcolor=#d6d6d6
| 365369 ||  || — || October 11, 2009 || La Sagra || OAM Obs. || — || align=right | 4.8 km || 
|-id=370 bgcolor=#E9E9E9
| 365370 ||  || — || October 14, 2009 || Catalina || CSS || IAN || align=right | 1.0 km || 
|-id=371 bgcolor=#d6d6d6
| 365371 ||  || — || October 15, 2009 || Catalina || CSS || — || align=right | 2.6 km || 
|-id=372 bgcolor=#d6d6d6
| 365372 ||  || — || July 3, 2003 || Kitt Peak || Spacewatch || — || align=right | 3.4 km || 
|-id=373 bgcolor=#d6d6d6
| 365373 ||  || — || October 15, 2009 || La Sagra || OAM Obs. || — || align=right | 4.5 km || 
|-id=374 bgcolor=#d6d6d6
| 365374 ||  || — || October 2, 2009 || Mount Lemmon || Mount Lemmon Survey || VER || align=right | 3.0 km || 
|-id=375 bgcolor=#d6d6d6
| 365375 Serebrov ||  ||  || October 19, 2009 || Zelenchukskaya S || T. V. Kryachko || — || align=right | 4.7 km || 
|-id=376 bgcolor=#d6d6d6
| 365376 ||  || — || October 18, 2009 || Mount Lemmon || Mount Lemmon Survey || TIR || align=right | 3.2 km || 
|-id=377 bgcolor=#d6d6d6
| 365377 ||  || — || October 18, 2009 || Kitt Peak || Spacewatch || ALA || align=right | 3.8 km || 
|-id=378 bgcolor=#d6d6d6
| 365378 ||  || — || October 22, 2009 || Catalina || CSS || ALA || align=right | 3.5 km || 
|-id=379 bgcolor=#d6d6d6
| 365379 ||  || — || October 15, 2009 || Catalina || CSS || VER || align=right | 2.8 km || 
|-id=380 bgcolor=#d6d6d6
| 365380 ||  || — || October 22, 2009 || Catalina || CSS || — || align=right | 5.4 km || 
|-id=381 bgcolor=#d6d6d6
| 365381 ||  || — || October 22, 2009 || Catalina || CSS || — || align=right | 4.3 km || 
|-id=382 bgcolor=#d6d6d6
| 365382 ||  || — || October 23, 2009 || Kitt Peak || Spacewatch || — || align=right | 2.6 km || 
|-id=383 bgcolor=#d6d6d6
| 365383 ||  || — || October 16, 2009 || Catalina || CSS || YAK || align=right | 4.5 km || 
|-id=384 bgcolor=#d6d6d6
| 365384 ||  || — || November 9, 2009 || Catalina || CSS || — || align=right | 3.4 km || 
|-id=385 bgcolor=#d6d6d6
| 365385 ||  || — || November 12, 2009 || Hibiscus || N. Teamo || — || align=right | 3.8 km || 
|-id=386 bgcolor=#d6d6d6
| 365386 ||  || — || November 15, 2009 || Catalina || CSS || — || align=right | 6.0 km || 
|-id=387 bgcolor=#d6d6d6
| 365387 ||  || — || November 8, 2009 || Kitt Peak || Spacewatch || — || align=right | 2.9 km || 
|-id=388 bgcolor=#d6d6d6
| 365388 ||  || — || May 18, 2002 || Palomar || NEAT || — || align=right | 3.1 km || 
|-id=389 bgcolor=#d6d6d6
| 365389 ||  || — || November 10, 2009 || Catalina || CSS || — || align=right | 5.4 km || 
|-id=390 bgcolor=#d6d6d6
| 365390 ||  || — || December 19, 2004 || Kitt Peak || Spacewatch || — || align=right | 3.3 km || 
|-id=391 bgcolor=#d6d6d6
| 365391 ||  || — || November 8, 2009 || Catalina || CSS || — || align=right | 4.6 km || 
|-id=392 bgcolor=#d6d6d6
| 365392 ||  || — || November 10, 2009 || Catalina || CSS || EUP || align=right | 5.3 km || 
|-id=393 bgcolor=#d6d6d6
| 365393 ||  || — || November 9, 2009 || Catalina || CSS || — || align=right | 5.5 km || 
|-id=394 bgcolor=#d6d6d6
| 365394 ||  || — || November 18, 2009 || Kitt Peak || Spacewatch || 7:4 || align=right | 5.3 km || 
|-id=395 bgcolor=#d6d6d6
| 365395 ||  || — || November 19, 2009 || Kitt Peak || Spacewatch || — || align=right | 5.3 km || 
|-id=396 bgcolor=#d6d6d6
| 365396 ||  || — || September 27, 2003 || Apache Point || SDSS || VER || align=right | 3.3 km || 
|-id=397 bgcolor=#d6d6d6
| 365397 ||  || — || November 16, 2009 || Mount Lemmon || Mount Lemmon Survey || THM || align=right | 2.2 km || 
|-id=398 bgcolor=#d6d6d6
| 365398 ||  || — || November 16, 2009 || Mount Lemmon || Mount Lemmon Survey || — || align=right | 5.3 km || 
|-id=399 bgcolor=#d6d6d6
| 365399 ||  || — || November 16, 2009 || Mount Lemmon || Mount Lemmon Survey || URS || align=right | 4.3 km || 
|-id=400 bgcolor=#d6d6d6
| 365400 ||  || — || April 14, 2007 || Mount Lemmon || Mount Lemmon Survey || THM || align=right | 2.4 km || 
|}

365401–365500 

|-bgcolor=#d6d6d6
| 365401 ||  || — || November 26, 2009 || Mount Lemmon || Mount Lemmon Survey || 7:4 || align=right | 5.8 km || 
|-id=402 bgcolor=#d6d6d6
| 365402 ||  || — || November 16, 2009 || Mount Lemmon || Mount Lemmon Survey || — || align=right | 6.1 km || 
|-id=403 bgcolor=#d6d6d6
| 365403 ||  || — || November 17, 2009 || Socorro || LINEAR || — || align=right | 4.0 km || 
|-id=404 bgcolor=#d6d6d6
| 365404 ||  || — || December 15, 2009 || Catalina || CSS || EUP || align=right | 5.9 km || 
|-id=405 bgcolor=#d6d6d6
| 365405 ||  || — || December 18, 2009 || Mount Lemmon || Mount Lemmon Survey || — || align=right | 6.1 km || 
|-id=406 bgcolor=#fefefe
| 365406 ||  || — || January 10, 2010 || Catalina || CSS || H || align=right data-sort-value="0.94" | 940 m || 
|-id=407 bgcolor=#fefefe
| 365407 ||  || — || January 12, 2010 || Catalina || CSS || H || align=right data-sort-value="0.71" | 710 m || 
|-id=408 bgcolor=#d6d6d6
| 365408 ||  || — || February 1, 2006 || Bergisch Gladbach || W. Bickel || — || align=right | 5.2 km || 
|-id=409 bgcolor=#d6d6d6
| 365409 ||  || — || April 25, 2007 || Mount Lemmon || Mount Lemmon Survey || ULA7:4 || align=right | 5.9 km || 
|-id=410 bgcolor=#E9E9E9
| 365410 ||  || — || February 17, 2010 || Kitt Peak || Spacewatch || — || align=right | 1.7 km || 
|-id=411 bgcolor=#E9E9E9
| 365411 ||  || — || March 12, 2010 || Kitt Peak || Spacewatch || — || align=right | 1.6 km || 
|-id=412 bgcolor=#E9E9E9
| 365412 ||  || — || June 26, 1997 || Kitt Peak || Spacewatch || — || align=right | 3.0 km || 
|-id=413 bgcolor=#fefefe
| 365413 ||  || — || February 19, 2010 || Catalina || CSS || H || align=right data-sort-value="0.68" | 680 m || 
|-id=414 bgcolor=#fefefe
| 365414 ||  || — || March 16, 2010 || Mount Lemmon || Mount Lemmon Survey || H || align=right data-sort-value="0.63" | 630 m || 
|-id=415 bgcolor=#fefefe
| 365415 ||  || — || February 18, 2010 || Mount Lemmon || Mount Lemmon Survey || H || align=right data-sort-value="0.80" | 800 m || 
|-id=416 bgcolor=#fefefe
| 365416 ||  || — || November 25, 2009 || Catalina || CSS || H || align=right data-sort-value="0.86" | 860 m || 
|-id=417 bgcolor=#fefefe
| 365417 ||  || — || March 25, 2010 || Mount Lemmon || Mount Lemmon Survey || H || align=right data-sort-value="0.71" | 710 m || 
|-id=418 bgcolor=#fefefe
| 365418 ||  || — || March 17, 2010 || Catalina || CSS || H || align=right data-sort-value="0.82" | 820 m || 
|-id=419 bgcolor=#d6d6d6
| 365419 ||  || — || October 26, 2008 || Kitt Peak || Spacewatch || — || align=right | 5.4 km || 
|-id=420 bgcolor=#fefefe
| 365420 ||  || — || April 20, 2010 || WISE || WISE || — || align=right | 1.2 km || 
|-id=421 bgcolor=#fefefe
| 365421 ||  || — || May 3, 2010 || WISE || WISE || — || align=right | 2.6 km || 
|-id=422 bgcolor=#d6d6d6
| 365422 ||  || — || May 12, 2010 || WISE || WISE || — || align=right | 5.0 km || 
|-id=423 bgcolor=#fefefe
| 365423 ||  || — || October 16, 2007 || Catalina || CSS || — || align=right | 1.9 km || 
|-id=424 bgcolor=#FFC2E0
| 365424 ||  || — || May 16, 2010 || WISE || WISE || ATEPHAcritical || align=right data-sort-value="0.21" | 210 m || 
|-id=425 bgcolor=#fefefe
| 365425 ||  || — || May 23, 2010 || WISE || WISE || — || align=right | 1.5 km || 
|-id=426 bgcolor=#FA8072
| 365426 ||  || — || October 11, 1977 || Palomar || PLS || — || align=right data-sort-value="0.79" | 790 m || 
|-id=427 bgcolor=#E9E9E9
| 365427 ||  || — || May 29, 2010 || WISE || WISE || DOR || align=right | 3.4 km || 
|-id=428 bgcolor=#fefefe
| 365428 ||  || — || September 16, 2003 || Kitt Peak || Spacewatch || — || align=right | 3.4 km || 
|-id=429 bgcolor=#d6d6d6
| 365429 ||  || — || June 6, 2010 || WISE || WISE || — || align=right | 4.5 km || 
|-id=430 bgcolor=#E9E9E9
| 365430 ||  || — || June 7, 2010 || WISE || WISE || — || align=right | 2.7 km || 
|-id=431 bgcolor=#fefefe
| 365431 ||  || — || June 8, 2010 || WISE || WISE || PHO || align=right | 1.1 km || 
|-id=432 bgcolor=#d6d6d6
| 365432 ||  || — || June 8, 2010 || WISE || WISE || MEL || align=right | 2.4 km || 
|-id=433 bgcolor=#E9E9E9
| 365433 ||  || — || June 12, 2010 || WISE || WISE || — || align=right | 3.1 km || 
|-id=434 bgcolor=#fefefe
| 365434 ||  || — || June 13, 2010 || WISE || WISE || — || align=right | 1.4 km || 
|-id=435 bgcolor=#FA8072
| 365435 ||  || — || June 13, 2010 || Socorro || LINEAR || — || align=right data-sort-value="0.79" | 790 m || 
|-id=436 bgcolor=#FA8072
| 365436 ||  || — || June 14, 2010 || Mount Lemmon || Mount Lemmon Survey || — || align=right data-sort-value="0.57" | 570 m || 
|-id=437 bgcolor=#fefefe
| 365437 ||  || — || June 14, 2010 || WISE || WISE || ERI || align=right | 1.7 km || 
|-id=438 bgcolor=#fefefe
| 365438 ||  || — || August 30, 2006 || Anderson Mesa || LONEOS || — || align=right | 2.2 km || 
|-id=439 bgcolor=#fefefe
| 365439 ||  || — || June 15, 2010 || WISE || WISE || — || align=right data-sort-value="0.99" | 990 m || 
|-id=440 bgcolor=#d6d6d6
| 365440 ||  || — || June 15, 2010 || WISE || WISE || — || align=right | 4.0 km || 
|-id=441 bgcolor=#E9E9E9
| 365441 ||  || — || September 26, 2006 || Mount Lemmon || Mount Lemmon Survey || — || align=right | 2.1 km || 
|-id=442 bgcolor=#d6d6d6
| 365442 ||  || — || June 23, 2010 || WISE || WISE || — || align=right | 2.7 km || 
|-id=443 bgcolor=#fefefe
| 365443 Holiday ||  ||  || June 23, 2010 || WISE || WISE || — || align=right | 2.1 km || 
|-id=444 bgcolor=#fefefe
| 365444 ||  || — || September 28, 2003 || Kitt Peak || Spacewatch || ERI || align=right | 1.5 km || 
|-id=445 bgcolor=#d6d6d6
| 365445 ||  || — || June 24, 2010 || WISE || WISE || — || align=right | 3.3 km || 
|-id=446 bgcolor=#fefefe
| 365446 ||  || — || October 3, 1999 || Socorro || LINEAR || — || align=right | 2.2 km || 
|-id=447 bgcolor=#fefefe
| 365447 ||  || — || June 30, 2010 || WISE || WISE || — || align=right | 1.5 km || 
|-id=448 bgcolor=#d6d6d6
| 365448 ||  || — || September 11, 2004 || Kitt Peak || Spacewatch || — || align=right | 4.4 km || 
|-id=449 bgcolor=#FFC2E0
| 365449 ||  || — || July 3, 2010 || WISE || WISE || ATE || align=right data-sort-value="0.22" | 220 m || 
|-id=450 bgcolor=#fefefe
| 365450 ||  || — || July 4, 2010 || Kitt Peak || Spacewatch || V || align=right data-sort-value="0.78" | 780 m || 
|-id=451 bgcolor=#E9E9E9
| 365451 ||  || — || May 20, 2005 || Palomar || NEAT || HNS || align=right | 1.6 km || 
|-id=452 bgcolor=#fefefe
| 365452 ||  || — || May 30, 2006 || Mount Lemmon || Mount Lemmon Survey || NYS || align=right | 1.4 km || 
|-id=453 bgcolor=#d6d6d6
| 365453 ||  || — || October 6, 1999 || Socorro || LINEAR || LIX || align=right | 3.5 km || 
|-id=454 bgcolor=#E9E9E9
| 365454 ||  || — || November 20, 2006 || Kitt Peak || Spacewatch || — || align=right | 2.4 km || 
|-id=455 bgcolor=#fefefe
| 365455 ||  || — || July 10, 2010 || WISE || WISE || — || align=right | 1.2 km || 
|-id=456 bgcolor=#d6d6d6
| 365456 ||  || — || January 28, 2010 || WISE || WISE || URS || align=right | 4.7 km || 
|-id=457 bgcolor=#fefefe
| 365457 ||  || — || November 19, 2003 || Kitt Peak || Spacewatch || — || align=right | 1.4 km || 
|-id=458 bgcolor=#E9E9E9
| 365458 ||  || — || July 1, 2010 || WISE || WISE || — || align=right | 2.8 km || 
|-id=459 bgcolor=#d6d6d6
| 365459 ||  || — || July 2, 2010 || WISE || WISE || LIX || align=right | 4.0 km || 
|-id=460 bgcolor=#fefefe
| 365460 ||  || — || July 2, 2010 || WISE || WISE || — || align=right data-sort-value="0.83" | 830 m || 
|-id=461 bgcolor=#E9E9E9
| 365461 ||  || — || August 26, 2005 || Anderson Mesa || LONEOS || CLO || align=right | 1.8 km || 
|-id=462 bgcolor=#d6d6d6
| 365462 ||  || — || November 4, 1999 || Socorro || LINEAR || — || align=right | 3.0 km || 
|-id=463 bgcolor=#E9E9E9
| 365463 ||  || — || October 4, 2006 || Mount Lemmon || Mount Lemmon Survey || — || align=right | 1.4 km || 
|-id=464 bgcolor=#E9E9E9
| 365464 ||  || — || August 23, 2001 || Anderson Mesa || LONEOS || EUN || align=right | 1.6 km || 
|-id=465 bgcolor=#E9E9E9
| 365465 ||  || — || September 12, 2001 || Socorro || LINEAR || — || align=right | 2.5 km || 
|-id=466 bgcolor=#E9E9E9
| 365466 ||  || — || July 21, 2010 || WISE || WISE || MAR || align=right | 3.2 km || 
|-id=467 bgcolor=#d6d6d6
| 365467 ||  || — || July 25, 2010 || WISE || WISE || — || align=right | 3.0 km || 
|-id=468 bgcolor=#d6d6d6
| 365468 ||  || — || July 27, 2010 || WISE || WISE || — || align=right | 4.9 km || 
|-id=469 bgcolor=#d6d6d6
| 365469 ||  || — || March 17, 2002 || Kitt Peak || Spacewatch || — || align=right | 4.3 km || 
|-id=470 bgcolor=#fefefe
| 365470 ||  || — || August 3, 2010 || Socorro || LINEAR || FLO || align=right data-sort-value="0.67" | 670 m || 
|-id=471 bgcolor=#fefefe
| 365471 ||  || — || August 4, 2010 || Socorro || LINEAR || — || align=right data-sort-value="0.74" | 740 m || 
|-id=472 bgcolor=#fefefe
| 365472 ||  || — || January 24, 1998 || Kitt Peak || Spacewatch || PHO || align=right | 1.9 km || 
|-id=473 bgcolor=#fefefe
| 365473 ||  || — || August 3, 2010 || Socorro || LINEAR || — || align=right data-sort-value="0.87" | 870 m || 
|-id=474 bgcolor=#fefefe
| 365474 ||  || — || August 3, 2010 || La Sagra || OAM Obs. || — || align=right data-sort-value="0.94" | 940 m || 
|-id=475 bgcolor=#C2FFFF
| 365475 ||  || — || December 8, 1998 || Kitt Peak || Spacewatch || L4 || align=right | 11 km || 
|-id=476 bgcolor=#d6d6d6
| 365476 ||  || — || September 12, 2004 || Socorro || LINEAR || EUP || align=right | 6.2 km || 
|-id=477 bgcolor=#fefefe
| 365477 ||  || — || August 19, 2002 || Palomar || NEAT || — || align=right | 2.1 km || 
|-id=478 bgcolor=#d6d6d6
| 365478 ||  || — || March 23, 2007 || Siding Spring || SSS || — || align=right | 5.7 km || 
|-id=479 bgcolor=#E9E9E9
| 365479 ||  || — || August 29, 2005 || Kitt Peak || Spacewatch || — || align=right | 2.7 km || 
|-id=480 bgcolor=#d6d6d6
| 365480 ||  || — || August 6, 2010 || WISE || WISE || — || align=right | 6.3 km || 
|-id=481 bgcolor=#E9E9E9
| 365481 ||  || — || March 6, 2008 || Mount Lemmon || Mount Lemmon Survey || — || align=right | 1.8 km || 
|-id=482 bgcolor=#d6d6d6
| 365482 ||  || — || August 6, 2010 || WISE || WISE || — || align=right | 3.8 km || 
|-id=483 bgcolor=#E9E9E9
| 365483 ||  || — || September 10, 2001 || Socorro || LINEAR || JUN || align=right | 1.4 km || 
|-id=484 bgcolor=#fefefe
| 365484 ||  || — || August 13, 2010 || Socorro || LINEAR || — || align=right | 1.0 km || 
|-id=485 bgcolor=#fefefe
| 365485 ||  || — || August 8, 2010 || La Sagra || OAM Obs. || V || align=right data-sort-value="0.67" | 670 m || 
|-id=486 bgcolor=#fefefe
| 365486 ||  || — || August 9, 2010 || XuYi || PMO NEO || LCI || align=right | 1.1 km || 
|-id=487 bgcolor=#fefefe
| 365487 ||  || — || August 11, 2010 || La Sagra || OAM Obs. || NYS || align=right data-sort-value="0.76" | 760 m || 
|-id=488 bgcolor=#fefefe
| 365488 ||  || — || August 2, 2010 || La Sagra || OAM Obs. || — || align=right data-sort-value="0.83" | 830 m || 
|-id=489 bgcolor=#fefefe
| 365489 ||  || — || April 30, 2006 || Kitt Peak || Spacewatch || FLO || align=right data-sort-value="0.62" | 620 m || 
|-id=490 bgcolor=#fefefe
| 365490 ||  || — || August 2, 2010 || La Sagra || OAM Obs. || NYS || align=right data-sort-value="0.81" | 810 m || 
|-id=491 bgcolor=#fefefe
| 365491 ||  || — || August 10, 2010 || Purple Mountain || PMO NEO || NYS || align=right data-sort-value="0.76" | 760 m || 
|-id=492 bgcolor=#fefefe
| 365492 ||  || — || August 19, 2010 || Kitt Peak || Spacewatch || NYS || align=right data-sort-value="0.74" | 740 m || 
|-id=493 bgcolor=#fefefe
| 365493 ||  || — || August 19, 2010 || Sandlot || G. Hug || — || align=right data-sort-value="0.97" | 970 m || 
|-id=494 bgcolor=#fefefe
| 365494 ||  || — || September 21, 2003 || Kitt Peak || Spacewatch || — || align=right data-sort-value="0.91" | 910 m || 
|-id=495 bgcolor=#fefefe
| 365495 ||  || — || September 1, 2010 || Socorro || LINEAR || — || align=right data-sort-value="0.94" | 940 m || 
|-id=496 bgcolor=#fefefe
| 365496 ||  || — || October 19, 2003 || Kitt Peak || Spacewatch || — || align=right data-sort-value="0.70" | 700 m || 
|-id=497 bgcolor=#fefefe
| 365497 ||  || — || November 16, 2003 || Kitt Peak || Spacewatch || MAS || align=right data-sort-value="0.80" | 800 m || 
|-id=498 bgcolor=#fefefe
| 365498 ||  || — || September 1, 2010 || Socorro || LINEAR || — || align=right | 1.1 km || 
|-id=499 bgcolor=#fefefe
| 365499 ||  || — || September 19, 2003 || Palomar || NEAT || V || align=right data-sort-value="0.64" | 640 m || 
|-id=500 bgcolor=#fefefe
| 365500 ||  || — || September 5, 2010 || La Sagra || OAM Obs. || V || align=right data-sort-value="0.65" | 650 m || 
|}

365501–365600 

|-bgcolor=#fefefe
| 365501 ||  || — || October 6, 1999 || Socorro || LINEAR || — || align=right data-sort-value="0.92" | 920 m || 
|-id=502 bgcolor=#fefefe
| 365502 ||  || — || August 16, 2006 || Palomar || NEAT || — || align=right data-sort-value="0.75" | 750 m || 
|-id=503 bgcolor=#fefefe
| 365503 ||  || — || October 9, 1999 || Kitt Peak || Spacewatch || V || align=right data-sort-value="0.59" | 590 m || 
|-id=504 bgcolor=#fefefe
| 365504 ||  || — || September 4, 2010 || Kitt Peak || Spacewatch || V || align=right data-sort-value="0.69" | 690 m || 
|-id=505 bgcolor=#fefefe
| 365505 ||  || — || June 13, 2010 || Mount Lemmon || Mount Lemmon Survey || — || align=right | 1.1 km || 
|-id=506 bgcolor=#fefefe
| 365506 ||  || — || September 6, 2010 || Socorro || LINEAR || — || align=right | 1.0 km || 
|-id=507 bgcolor=#E9E9E9
| 365507 ||  || — || February 28, 2008 || Mount Lemmon || Mount Lemmon Survey || MAR || align=right | 1.2 km || 
|-id=508 bgcolor=#E9E9E9
| 365508 ||  || — || September 8, 2010 || Socorro || LINEAR || EUN || align=right | 1.9 km || 
|-id=509 bgcolor=#E9E9E9
| 365509 ||  || — || September 17, 2006 || Kitt Peak || Spacewatch || — || align=right | 1.3 km || 
|-id=510 bgcolor=#fefefe
| 365510 ||  || — || September 10, 2010 || Kitt Peak || Spacewatch || FLO || align=right data-sort-value="0.66" | 660 m || 
|-id=511 bgcolor=#E9E9E9
| 365511 ||  || — || September 10, 2010 || Kitt Peak || Spacewatch || — || align=right | 2.0 km || 
|-id=512 bgcolor=#fefefe
| 365512 ||  || — || March 10, 2005 || Mount Lemmon || Mount Lemmon Survey || MAS || align=right data-sort-value="0.74" | 740 m || 
|-id=513 bgcolor=#fefefe
| 365513 ||  || — || November 16, 2003 || Kitt Peak || Spacewatch || NYS || align=right data-sort-value="0.64" | 640 m || 
|-id=514 bgcolor=#d6d6d6
| 365514 ||  || — || September 10, 2010 || Kitt Peak || Spacewatch || VER || align=right | 3.4 km || 
|-id=515 bgcolor=#d6d6d6
| 365515 ||  || — || October 1, 2005 || Mount Lemmon || Mount Lemmon Survey || — || align=right | 2.9 km || 
|-id=516 bgcolor=#E9E9E9
| 365516 ||  || — || March 11, 2008 || Mount Lemmon || Mount Lemmon Survey || — || align=right | 2.2 km || 
|-id=517 bgcolor=#E9E9E9
| 365517 ||  || — || September 11, 2010 || Kitt Peak || Spacewatch || HOF || align=right | 2.5 km || 
|-id=518 bgcolor=#E9E9E9
| 365518 ||  || — || December 15, 2006 || Kitt Peak || Spacewatch || WIT || align=right | 1.1 km || 
|-id=519 bgcolor=#fefefe
| 365519 ||  || — || December 1, 2003 || Kitt Peak || Spacewatch || V || align=right data-sort-value="0.89" | 890 m || 
|-id=520 bgcolor=#E9E9E9
| 365520 ||  || — || September 22, 2001 || Socorro || LINEAR || — || align=right | 1.6 km || 
|-id=521 bgcolor=#fefefe
| 365521 ||  || — || June 18, 2006 || Kitt Peak || Spacewatch || NYS || align=right data-sort-value="0.58" | 580 m || 
|-id=522 bgcolor=#E9E9E9
| 365522 ||  || — || March 12, 2004 || Palomar || NEAT || EUN || align=right | 1.4 km || 
|-id=523 bgcolor=#d6d6d6
| 365523 ||  || — || November 1, 2005 || Kitt Peak || Spacewatch || — || align=right | 2.5 km || 
|-id=524 bgcolor=#fefefe
| 365524 ||  || — || September 12, 2010 || Kitt Peak || Spacewatch || V || align=right data-sort-value="0.71" | 710 m || 
|-id=525 bgcolor=#fefefe
| 365525 ||  || — || August 12, 2006 || Palomar || NEAT || MAS || align=right data-sort-value="0.74" | 740 m || 
|-id=526 bgcolor=#E9E9E9
| 365526 ||  || — || April 4, 2008 || Catalina || CSS || — || align=right | 1.7 km || 
|-id=527 bgcolor=#d6d6d6
| 365527 ||  || — || November 10, 1996 || Kitt Peak || Spacewatch || — || align=right | 2.4 km || 
|-id=528 bgcolor=#fefefe
| 365528 ||  || — || June 20, 2006 || Mount Lemmon || Mount Lemmon Survey || — || align=right data-sort-value="0.91" | 910 m || 
|-id=529 bgcolor=#E9E9E9
| 365529 ||  || — || October 20, 2006 || Kitt Peak || Spacewatch || — || align=right | 1.3 km || 
|-id=530 bgcolor=#d6d6d6
| 365530 ||  || — || September 14, 2010 || Kitt Peak || Spacewatch || — || align=right | 2.6 km || 
|-id=531 bgcolor=#fefefe
| 365531 ||  || — || April 14, 1999 || Kitt Peak || Spacewatch || FLO || align=right data-sort-value="0.58" | 580 m || 
|-id=532 bgcolor=#fefefe
| 365532 ||  || — || November 11, 1996 || Kitt Peak || Spacewatch || — || align=right data-sort-value="0.64" | 640 m || 
|-id=533 bgcolor=#E9E9E9
| 365533 ||  || — || November 23, 2006 || Kitt Peak || Spacewatch || AGN || align=right | 1.0 km || 
|-id=534 bgcolor=#fefefe
| 365534 ||  || — || January 31, 2009 || Kitt Peak || Spacewatch || — || align=right data-sort-value="0.95" | 950 m || 
|-id=535 bgcolor=#E9E9E9
| 365535 ||  || — || September 30, 2006 || Mount Lemmon || Mount Lemmon Survey || — || align=right | 1.5 km || 
|-id=536 bgcolor=#fefefe
| 365536 ||  || — || September 16, 2003 || Kitt Peak || Spacewatch || — || align=right data-sort-value="0.65" | 650 m || 
|-id=537 bgcolor=#E9E9E9
| 365537 ||  || — || March 27, 2008 || Mount Lemmon || Mount Lemmon Survey || MRX || align=right | 1.1 km || 
|-id=538 bgcolor=#E9E9E9
| 365538 ||  || — || June 29, 2005 || Kitt Peak || Spacewatch || — || align=right | 1.6 km || 
|-id=539 bgcolor=#E9E9E9
| 365539 ||  || — || March 4, 2008 || Mount Lemmon || Mount Lemmon Survey || — || align=right | 1.9 km || 
|-id=540 bgcolor=#E9E9E9
| 365540 ||  || — || February 26, 2008 || Mount Lemmon || Mount Lemmon Survey || — || align=right | 2.2 km || 
|-id=541 bgcolor=#E9E9E9
| 365541 ||  || — || September 26, 2006 || Mount Lemmon || Mount Lemmon Survey || — || align=right data-sort-value="0.86" | 860 m || 
|-id=542 bgcolor=#fefefe
| 365542 ||  || — || October 29, 2003 || Kitt Peak || Spacewatch || — || align=right data-sort-value="0.87" | 870 m || 
|-id=543 bgcolor=#fefefe
| 365543 ||  || — || September 29, 2010 || Mount Lemmon || Mount Lemmon Survey || — || align=right data-sort-value="0.83" | 830 m || 
|-id=544 bgcolor=#fefefe
| 365544 ||  || — || August 13, 2006 || Palomar || NEAT || NYS || align=right data-sort-value="0.83" | 830 m || 
|-id=545 bgcolor=#d6d6d6
| 365545 ||  || — || October 11, 2005 || Kitt Peak || Spacewatch || — || align=right | 2.4 km || 
|-id=546 bgcolor=#E9E9E9
| 365546 ||  || — || August 30, 2005 || Kitt Peak || Spacewatch || HOF || align=right | 2.3 km || 
|-id=547 bgcolor=#d6d6d6
| 365547 ||  || — || December 6, 1999 || Kitt Peak || Spacewatch || HYG || align=right | 3.0 km || 
|-id=548 bgcolor=#d6d6d6
| 365548 ||  || — || October 29, 2005 || Mount Lemmon || Mount Lemmon Survey || — || align=right | 3.9 km || 
|-id=549 bgcolor=#fefefe
| 365549 ||  || — || August 18, 2006 || Palomar || NEAT || NYS || align=right data-sort-value="0.71" | 710 m || 
|-id=550 bgcolor=#fefefe
| 365550 ||  || — || October 23, 2003 || Kitt Peak || Spacewatch || NYS || align=right data-sort-value="0.70" | 700 m || 
|-id=551 bgcolor=#E9E9E9
| 365551 ||  || — || November 19, 2006 || Kitt Peak || Spacewatch || — || align=right | 1.5 km || 
|-id=552 bgcolor=#fefefe
| 365552 ||  || — || October 21, 2007 || Kitt Peak || Spacewatch || — || align=right data-sort-value="0.85" | 850 m || 
|-id=553 bgcolor=#E9E9E9
| 365553 ||  || — || September 21, 2001 || Anderson Mesa || LONEOS || — || align=right | 3.4 km || 
|-id=554 bgcolor=#E9E9E9
| 365554 ||  || — || March 26, 2008 || Mount Lemmon || Mount Lemmon Survey || — || align=right | 2.0 km || 
|-id=555 bgcolor=#E9E9E9
| 365555 ||  || — || September 25, 2006 || Kitt Peak || Spacewatch || — || align=right | 1.0 km || 
|-id=556 bgcolor=#d6d6d6
| 365556 ||  || — || August 31, 2005 || Kitt Peak || Spacewatch || HOF || align=right | 2.7 km || 
|-id=557 bgcolor=#d6d6d6
| 365557 ||  || — || November 19, 2006 || Kitt Peak || Spacewatch || — || align=right | 2.6 km || 
|-id=558 bgcolor=#E9E9E9
| 365558 ||  || — || September 17, 2010 || Kitt Peak || Spacewatch || — || align=right | 1.4 km || 
|-id=559 bgcolor=#E9E9E9
| 365559 ||  || — || September 19, 2006 || Kitt Peak || Spacewatch || — || align=right | 1.3 km || 
|-id=560 bgcolor=#E9E9E9
| 365560 ||  || — || September 18, 2010 || Mount Lemmon || Mount Lemmon Survey || AER || align=right | 1.5 km || 
|-id=561 bgcolor=#E9E9E9
| 365561 ||  || — || March 13, 2008 || Mount Lemmon || Mount Lemmon Survey || — || align=right | 1.8 km || 
|-id=562 bgcolor=#E9E9E9
| 365562 ||  || — || September 16, 2010 || Kitt Peak || Spacewatch || NEM || align=right | 2.1 km || 
|-id=563 bgcolor=#d6d6d6
| 365563 ||  || — || February 25, 2007 || Mount Lemmon || Mount Lemmon Survey || — || align=right | 2.9 km || 
|-id=564 bgcolor=#E9E9E9
| 365564 ||  || — || October 21, 2006 || Mount Lemmon || Mount Lemmon Survey || — || align=right data-sort-value="0.81" | 810 m || 
|-id=565 bgcolor=#d6d6d6
| 365565 ||  || — || December 25, 2006 || Kitt Peak || Spacewatch || CHA || align=right | 1.6 km || 
|-id=566 bgcolor=#fefefe
| 365566 ||  || — || September 15, 2010 || Kitt Peak || Spacewatch || FLO || align=right data-sort-value="0.77" | 770 m || 
|-id=567 bgcolor=#d6d6d6
| 365567 ||  || — || December 14, 2006 || Kitt Peak || Spacewatch || 628 || align=right | 1.4 km || 
|-id=568 bgcolor=#E9E9E9
| 365568 ||  || — || September 17, 2006 || Kitt Peak || Spacewatch || — || align=right data-sort-value="0.91" | 910 m || 
|-id=569 bgcolor=#fefefe
| 365569 ||  || — || February 19, 2009 || Kitt Peak || Spacewatch || NYS || align=right data-sort-value="0.74" | 740 m || 
|-id=570 bgcolor=#E9E9E9
| 365570 ||  || — || September 17, 2010 || Kitt Peak || Spacewatch || — || align=right | 2.1 km || 
|-id=571 bgcolor=#fefefe
| 365571 ||  || — || May 11, 2002 || Socorro || LINEAR || — || align=right data-sort-value="0.76" | 760 m || 
|-id=572 bgcolor=#E9E9E9
| 365572 ||  || — || July 3, 2005 || Mount Lemmon || Mount Lemmon Survey || — || align=right | 1.4 km || 
|-id=573 bgcolor=#E9E9E9
| 365573 ||  || — || September 16, 2010 || Kitt Peak || Spacewatch || HEN || align=right data-sort-value="0.95" | 950 m || 
|-id=574 bgcolor=#d6d6d6
| 365574 ||  || — || May 8, 2008 || Mount Lemmon || Mount Lemmon Survey || — || align=right | 4.9 km || 
|-id=575 bgcolor=#fefefe
| 365575 ||  || — || February 20, 2009 || Kitt Peak || Spacewatch || MAS || align=right data-sort-value="0.74" | 740 m || 
|-id=576 bgcolor=#d6d6d6
| 365576 ||  || — || November 25, 2005 || Mount Lemmon || Mount Lemmon Survey || HYG || align=right | 2.4 km || 
|-id=577 bgcolor=#E9E9E9
| 365577 ||  || — || May 28, 2009 || Kitt Peak || Spacewatch || — || align=right | 1.3 km || 
|-id=578 bgcolor=#fefefe
| 365578 ||  || — || September 25, 2003 || Haleakala || NEAT || — || align=right data-sort-value="0.63" | 630 m || 
|-id=579 bgcolor=#d6d6d6
| 365579 ||  || — || March 13, 2008 || Kitt Peak || Spacewatch || — || align=right | 2.4 km || 
|-id=580 bgcolor=#E9E9E9
| 365580 ||  || — || October 16, 2006 || Catalina || CSS || HNS || align=right | 1.6 km || 
|-id=581 bgcolor=#E9E9E9
| 365581 ||  || — || October 29, 1997 || Socorro || LINEAR || — || align=right | 2.0 km || 
|-id=582 bgcolor=#fefefe
| 365582 ||  || — || August 21, 2006 || Kitt Peak || Spacewatch || — || align=right data-sort-value="0.92" | 920 m || 
|-id=583 bgcolor=#E9E9E9
| 365583 ||  || — || February 28, 2008 || Mount Lemmon || Mount Lemmon Survey || — || align=right | 1.4 km || 
|-id=584 bgcolor=#E9E9E9
| 365584 ||  || — || March 8, 2008 || Kitt Peak || Spacewatch || — || align=right | 2.4 km || 
|-id=585 bgcolor=#d6d6d6
| 365585 ||  || — || February 9, 2007 || Mount Lemmon || Mount Lemmon Survey || CHA || align=right | 2.1 km || 
|-id=586 bgcolor=#E9E9E9
| 365586 ||  || — || November 16, 2006 || Kitt Peak || Spacewatch || — || align=right | 1.6 km || 
|-id=587 bgcolor=#E9E9E9
| 365587 ||  || — || August 27, 2005 || Palomar || NEAT || — || align=right | 2.6 km || 
|-id=588 bgcolor=#E9E9E9
| 365588 ||  || — || December 21, 2006 || Kitt Peak || Spacewatch || — || align=right | 2.0 km || 
|-id=589 bgcolor=#E9E9E9
| 365589 ||  || — || September 17, 2006 || Kitt Peak || Spacewatch || — || align=right | 1.0 km || 
|-id=590 bgcolor=#E9E9E9
| 365590 ||  || — || March 16, 2004 || Kitt Peak || Spacewatch || — || align=right | 1.1 km || 
|-id=591 bgcolor=#fefefe
| 365591 ||  || — || October 24, 2003 || Kitt Peak || Spacewatch || NYS || align=right data-sort-value="0.59" | 590 m || 
|-id=592 bgcolor=#fefefe
| 365592 ||  || — || February 27, 2009 || Kitt Peak || Spacewatch || — || align=right data-sort-value="0.83" | 830 m || 
|-id=593 bgcolor=#d6d6d6
| 365593 ||  || — || September 27, 2005 || Kitt Peak || Spacewatch || KOR || align=right | 1.2 km || 
|-id=594 bgcolor=#E9E9E9
| 365594 ||  || — || October 12, 2010 || Mount Lemmon || Mount Lemmon Survey || GEF || align=right | 1.6 km || 
|-id=595 bgcolor=#E9E9E9
| 365595 ||  || — || November 18, 2006 || Kitt Peak || Spacewatch || — || align=right | 1.2 km || 
|-id=596 bgcolor=#E9E9E9
| 365596 ||  || — || October 9, 2010 || Socorro || LINEAR || — || align=right | 2.4 km || 
|-id=597 bgcolor=#fefefe
| 365597 ||  || — || May 30, 2006 || Mount Lemmon || Mount Lemmon Survey || — || align=right | 1.1 km || 
|-id=598 bgcolor=#d6d6d6
| 365598 ||  || — || October 12, 2010 || Črni Vrh || Črni Vrh || EUP || align=right | 3.9 km || 
|-id=599 bgcolor=#E9E9E9
| 365599 ||  || — || July 21, 2010 || WISE || WISE || — || align=right | 2.1 km || 
|-id=600 bgcolor=#d6d6d6
| 365600 ||  || — || October 22, 2005 || Kitt Peak || Spacewatch || BRA || align=right | 2.3 km || 
|}

365601–365700 

|-bgcolor=#E9E9E9
| 365601 ||  || — || November 17, 2006 || Mount Lemmon || Mount Lemmon Survey || — || align=right | 1.5 km || 
|-id=602 bgcolor=#E9E9E9
| 365602 ||  || — || February 10, 2008 || Kitt Peak || Spacewatch || AER || align=right | 1.2 km || 
|-id=603 bgcolor=#d6d6d6
| 365603 ||  || — || October 10, 2010 || Plana || F. Fratev || EOS || align=right | 1.9 km || 
|-id=604 bgcolor=#fefefe
| 365604 Rusholme ||  ||  || October 8, 2010 || Palomar || PTF || V || align=right data-sort-value="0.82" | 820 m || 
|-id=605 bgcolor=#E9E9E9
| 365605 ||  || — || September 28, 2006 || Mount Lemmon || Mount Lemmon Survey || HEN || align=right data-sort-value="0.99" | 990 m || 
|-id=606 bgcolor=#E9E9E9
| 365606 ||  || — || September 17, 2010 || Mount Lemmon || Mount Lemmon Survey || — || align=right | 2.0 km || 
|-id=607 bgcolor=#E9E9E9
| 365607 ||  || — || March 11, 2008 || Kitt Peak || Spacewatch || WIT || align=right | 1.1 km || 
|-id=608 bgcolor=#d6d6d6
| 365608 ||  || — || December 7, 1999 || Kitt Peak || Spacewatch || — || align=right | 3.5 km || 
|-id=609 bgcolor=#E9E9E9
| 365609 ||  || — || February 28, 2008 || Kitt Peak || Spacewatch || HEN || align=right | 1.2 km || 
|-id=610 bgcolor=#d6d6d6
| 365610 ||  || — || October 17, 2010 || Mount Lemmon || Mount Lemmon Survey || — || align=right | 2.8 km || 
|-id=611 bgcolor=#E9E9E9
| 365611 ||  || — || March 4, 2008 || Mount Lemmon || Mount Lemmon Survey || — || align=right | 2.8 km || 
|-id=612 bgcolor=#E9E9E9
| 365612 ||  || — || November 10, 2006 || Kitt Peak || Spacewatch || — || align=right data-sort-value="0.91" | 910 m || 
|-id=613 bgcolor=#E9E9E9
| 365613 ||  || — || July 11, 2005 || Mount Lemmon || Mount Lemmon Survey || NEM || align=right | 2.0 km || 
|-id=614 bgcolor=#d6d6d6
| 365614 ||  || — || October 29, 2010 || Kitt Peak || Spacewatch || — || align=right | 2.9 km || 
|-id=615 bgcolor=#d6d6d6
| 365615 ||  || — || October 30, 2005 || Kitt Peak || Spacewatch || TEL || align=right | 1.6 km || 
|-id=616 bgcolor=#E9E9E9
| 365616 ||  || — || September 1, 2005 || Kitt Peak || Spacewatch || — || align=right | 2.0 km || 
|-id=617 bgcolor=#d6d6d6
| 365617 ||  || — || July 24, 2010 || WISE || WISE || URS || align=right | 3.8 km || 
|-id=618 bgcolor=#fefefe
| 365618 ||  || — || May 26, 2006 || Mount Lemmon || Mount Lemmon Survey || ERI || align=right | 2.1 km || 
|-id=619 bgcolor=#d6d6d6
| 365619 ||  || — || March 15, 2007 || Kitt Peak || Spacewatch || — || align=right | 2.4 km || 
|-id=620 bgcolor=#E9E9E9
| 365620 ||  || — || July 14, 2001 || Palomar || NEAT || MAR || align=right | 1.3 km || 
|-id=621 bgcolor=#E9E9E9
| 365621 ||  || — || November 18, 2006 || Kitt Peak || Spacewatch || PAD || align=right | 2.8 km || 
|-id=622 bgcolor=#E9E9E9
| 365622 ||  || — || August 19, 2001 || Socorro || LINEAR || — || align=right | 1.5 km || 
|-id=623 bgcolor=#E9E9E9
| 365623 ||  || — || March 17, 2004 || Kitt Peak || Spacewatch || — || align=right | 1.8 km || 
|-id=624 bgcolor=#E9E9E9
| 365624 ||  || — || October 21, 2006 || Kitt Peak || Spacewatch || MAR || align=right | 1.2 km || 
|-id=625 bgcolor=#d6d6d6
| 365625 ||  || — || June 15, 2004 || Kitt Peak || Spacewatch || CHA || align=right | 2.2 km || 
|-id=626 bgcolor=#d6d6d6
| 365626 ||  || — || December 4, 2005 || Kitt Peak || Spacewatch || — || align=right | 3.9 km || 
|-id=627 bgcolor=#d6d6d6
| 365627 ||  || — || April 1, 2008 || Kitt Peak || Spacewatch || TEL || align=right | 1.6 km || 
|-id=628 bgcolor=#d6d6d6
| 365628 ||  || — || April 19, 2002 || Kitt Peak || Spacewatch || EOS || align=right | 2.1 km || 
|-id=629 bgcolor=#d6d6d6
| 365629 ||  || — || October 29, 2010 || Kitt Peak || Spacewatch || EOS || align=right | 2.4 km || 
|-id=630 bgcolor=#d6d6d6
| 365630 ||  || — || March 26, 2007 || Mount Lemmon || Mount Lemmon Survey || — || align=right | 3.1 km || 
|-id=631 bgcolor=#E9E9E9
| 365631 ||  || — || August 26, 2001 || Palomar || NEAT || — || align=right | 2.0 km || 
|-id=632 bgcolor=#E9E9E9
| 365632 ||  || — || March 20, 1999 || Apache Point || SDSS || — || align=right | 2.2 km || 
|-id=633 bgcolor=#d6d6d6
| 365633 ||  || — || January 17, 2007 || Kitt Peak || Spacewatch || CHA || align=right | 2.1 km || 
|-id=634 bgcolor=#d6d6d6
| 365634 ||  || — || November 13, 1999 || Kitt Peak || Spacewatch || EUP || align=right | 3.2 km || 
|-id=635 bgcolor=#E9E9E9
| 365635 ||  || — || August 4, 2001 || Palomar || NEAT || MAR || align=right | 1.3 km || 
|-id=636 bgcolor=#E9E9E9
| 365636 ||  || — || July 27, 2010 || WISE || WISE || ADE || align=right | 2.1 km || 
|-id=637 bgcolor=#d6d6d6
| 365637 ||  || — || March 16, 2007 || Kitt Peak || Spacewatch || — || align=right | 3.2 km || 
|-id=638 bgcolor=#E9E9E9
| 365638 ||  || — || October 19, 2010 || Mount Lemmon || Mount Lemmon Survey || — || align=right | 2.2 km || 
|-id=639 bgcolor=#E9E9E9
| 365639 ||  || — || July 31, 2010 || WISE || WISE || HOF || align=right | 3.2 km || 
|-id=640 bgcolor=#d6d6d6
| 365640 ||  || — || July 27, 2009 || La Sagra || OAM Obs. || — || align=right | 3.0 km || 
|-id=641 bgcolor=#d6d6d6
| 365641 ||  || — || February 3, 2006 || Kitt Peak || Spacewatch || HYG || align=right | 3.4 km || 
|-id=642 bgcolor=#d6d6d6
| 365642 ||  || — || October 16, 2010 || La Sagra || OAM Obs. || — || align=right | 4.1 km || 
|-id=643 bgcolor=#E9E9E9
| 365643 ||  || — || October 30, 2010 || Kitt Peak || Spacewatch || — || align=right | 2.6 km || 
|-id=644 bgcolor=#E9E9E9
| 365644 ||  || — || September 17, 2001 || Socorro || LINEAR || — || align=right | 2.0 km || 
|-id=645 bgcolor=#E9E9E9
| 365645 ||  || — || September 18, 2010 || Mount Lemmon || Mount Lemmon Survey || — || align=right | 2.0 km || 
|-id=646 bgcolor=#d6d6d6
| 365646 ||  || — || September 29, 2010 || Mount Lemmon || Mount Lemmon Survey || — || align=right | 3.2 km || 
|-id=647 bgcolor=#E9E9E9
| 365647 ||  || — || August 31, 2005 || Kitt Peak || Spacewatch || — || align=right | 2.0 km || 
|-id=648 bgcolor=#d6d6d6
| 365648 ||  || — || March 15, 2007 || Kitt Peak || Spacewatch || — || align=right | 2.0 km || 
|-id=649 bgcolor=#E9E9E9
| 365649 ||  || — || December 6, 1996 || Kitt Peak || Spacewatch || — || align=right | 2.0 km || 
|-id=650 bgcolor=#fefefe
| 365650 ||  || — || June 4, 2006 || Mount Lemmon || Mount Lemmon Survey || — || align=right data-sort-value="0.94" | 940 m || 
|-id=651 bgcolor=#d6d6d6
| 365651 ||  || — || December 4, 2005 || Kitt Peak || Spacewatch || — || align=right | 3.0 km || 
|-id=652 bgcolor=#C2FFFF
| 365652 ||  || — || November 1, 2010 || Kitt Peak || Spacewatch || L4 || align=right | 11 km || 
|-id=653 bgcolor=#E9E9E9
| 365653 ||  || — || August 24, 2001 || Haleakala || NEAT || — || align=right | 1.2 km || 
|-id=654 bgcolor=#d6d6d6
| 365654 ||  || — || August 10, 2010 || Kitt Peak || Spacewatch || — || align=right | 3.8 km || 
|-id=655 bgcolor=#d6d6d6
| 365655 ||  || — || August 10, 2010 || Kitt Peak || Spacewatch || — || align=right | 5.3 km || 
|-id=656 bgcolor=#E9E9E9
| 365656 ||  || — || December 10, 2006 || Kitt Peak || Spacewatch || — || align=right | 1.5 km || 
|-id=657 bgcolor=#E9E9E9
| 365657 ||  || — || September 11, 2010 || Mount Lemmon || Mount Lemmon Survey || — || align=right | 1.4 km || 
|-id=658 bgcolor=#E9E9E9
| 365658 ||  || — || April 13, 2008 || Kitt Peak || Spacewatch || — || align=right | 2.0 km || 
|-id=659 bgcolor=#d6d6d6
| 365659 ||  || — || February 21, 2007 || Kitt Peak || Spacewatch || — || align=right | 2.1 km || 
|-id=660 bgcolor=#E9E9E9
| 365660 ||  || — || December 12, 2006 || Kitt Peak || Spacewatch || BRG || align=right | 1.7 km || 
|-id=661 bgcolor=#d6d6d6
| 365661 ||  || — || April 11, 2008 || Kitt Peak || Spacewatch || — || align=right | 2.7 km || 
|-id=662 bgcolor=#E9E9E9
| 365662 ||  || — || September 15, 2010 || Les Engarouines || L. Bernasconi || — || align=right | 1.6 km || 
|-id=663 bgcolor=#C2FFFF
| 365663 ||  || — || September 18, 2010 || Mount Lemmon || Mount Lemmon Survey || L4 || align=right | 12 km || 
|-id=664 bgcolor=#d6d6d6
| 365664 ||  || — || October 10, 2004 || Kitt Peak || L. H. Wasserman || — || align=right | 4.2 km || 
|-id=665 bgcolor=#d6d6d6
| 365665 ||  || — || September 15, 2009 || Kitt Peak || Spacewatch || — || align=right | 4.1 km || 
|-id=666 bgcolor=#d6d6d6
| 365666 ||  || — || October 13, 2010 || Mount Lemmon || Mount Lemmon Survey || EUP || align=right | 4.6 km || 
|-id=667 bgcolor=#E9E9E9
| 365667 ||  || — || September 17, 2010 || Mount Lemmon || Mount Lemmon Survey || — || align=right | 2.9 km || 
|-id=668 bgcolor=#d6d6d6
| 365668 ||  || — || October 13, 2010 || Mount Lemmon || Mount Lemmon Survey || EOS || align=right | 2.3 km || 
|-id=669 bgcolor=#d6d6d6
| 365669 ||  || — || April 4, 2002 || Kitt Peak || Spacewatch || EOS || align=right | 2.4 km || 
|-id=670 bgcolor=#d6d6d6
| 365670 ||  || — || November 7, 2010 || Kitt Peak || Spacewatch || — || align=right | 3.3 km || 
|-id=671 bgcolor=#E9E9E9
| 365671 ||  || — || March 23, 2003 || Apache Point || SDSS || — || align=right | 2.5 km || 
|-id=672 bgcolor=#d6d6d6
| 365672 ||  || — || September 3, 2010 || Mount Lemmon || Mount Lemmon Survey || — || align=right | 3.2 km || 
|-id=673 bgcolor=#d6d6d6
| 365673 ||  || — || April 18, 2007 || Kitt Peak || Spacewatch || TIR || align=right | 3.7 km || 
|-id=674 bgcolor=#E9E9E9
| 365674 ||  || — || March 12, 2008 || Mount Lemmon || Mount Lemmon Survey || — || align=right | 1.8 km || 
|-id=675 bgcolor=#E9E9E9
| 365675 ||  || — || April 23, 2004 || Kitt Peak || Spacewatch || — || align=right | 1.7 km || 
|-id=676 bgcolor=#d6d6d6
| 365676 ||  || — || October 29, 2005 || Mount Lemmon || Mount Lemmon Survey || EOS || align=right | 1.9 km || 
|-id=677 bgcolor=#d6d6d6
| 365677 ||  || — || May 5, 2008 || Mount Lemmon || Mount Lemmon Survey || EOS || align=right | 2.1 km || 
|-id=678 bgcolor=#d6d6d6
| 365678 ||  || — || October 10, 1999 || Socorro || LINEAR || — || align=right | 2.6 km || 
|-id=679 bgcolor=#d6d6d6
| 365679 ||  || — || November 5, 1999 || Kitt Peak || Spacewatch || — || align=right | 2.7 km || 
|-id=680 bgcolor=#d6d6d6
| 365680 ||  || — || September 4, 2010 || Kitt Peak || Spacewatch || — || align=right | 3.9 km || 
|-id=681 bgcolor=#E9E9E9
| 365681 ||  || — || October 29, 2010 || Kitt Peak || Spacewatch || — || align=right | 1.3 km || 
|-id=682 bgcolor=#d6d6d6
| 365682 ||  || — || November 1, 2005 || Mount Lemmon || Mount Lemmon Survey || — || align=right | 2.4 km || 
|-id=683 bgcolor=#E9E9E9
| 365683 ||  || — || June 6, 2005 || Kitt Peak || Spacewatch || — || align=right | 1.5 km || 
|-id=684 bgcolor=#d6d6d6
| 365684 ||  || — || July 27, 2009 || Kitt Peak || Spacewatch || — || align=right | 2.9 km || 
|-id=685 bgcolor=#E9E9E9
| 365685 ||  || — || November 19, 2006 || Kitt Peak || Spacewatch || — || align=right | 1.0 km || 
|-id=686 bgcolor=#E9E9E9
| 365686 ||  || — || December 16, 2006 || Kitt Peak || Spacewatch || — || align=right | 1.2 km || 
|-id=687 bgcolor=#E9E9E9
| 365687 ||  || — || November 5, 2010 || Socorro || LINEAR || RAF || align=right | 1.3 km || 
|-id=688 bgcolor=#d6d6d6
| 365688 ||  || — || December 2, 2005 || Kitt Peak || Spacewatch || — || align=right | 3.6 km || 
|-id=689 bgcolor=#E9E9E9
| 365689 ||  || — || April 14, 2008 || Kitt Peak || Spacewatch || — || align=right | 2.3 km || 
|-id=690 bgcolor=#E9E9E9
| 365690 ||  || — || October 3, 2006 || Mount Lemmon || Mount Lemmon Survey || — || align=right | 1.0 km || 
|-id=691 bgcolor=#d6d6d6
| 365691 ||  || — || December 24, 2005 || Kitt Peak || Spacewatch || — || align=right | 2.7 km || 
|-id=692 bgcolor=#d6d6d6
| 365692 ||  || — || February 26, 2007 || Mount Lemmon || Mount Lemmon Survey || HYG || align=right | 2.7 km || 
|-id=693 bgcolor=#E9E9E9
| 365693 ||  || — || November 20, 2006 || Kitt Peak || Spacewatch || — || align=right | 1.1 km || 
|-id=694 bgcolor=#d6d6d6
| 365694 ||  || — || October 9, 2010 || Mount Lemmon || Mount Lemmon Survey || BRA || align=right | 2.0 km || 
|-id=695 bgcolor=#C2FFFF
| 365695 ||  || — || September 16, 2009 || Kitt Peak || Spacewatch || L4 || align=right | 7.9 km || 
|-id=696 bgcolor=#d6d6d6
| 365696 ||  || — || August 18, 2009 || Bergisch Gladbac || W. Bickel || EOS || align=right | 2.0 km || 
|-id=697 bgcolor=#E9E9E9
| 365697 ||  || — || December 18, 2001 || Socorro || LINEAR || — || align=right | 2.5 km || 
|-id=698 bgcolor=#E9E9E9
| 365698 ||  || — || September 3, 2005 || Palomar || NEAT || — || align=right | 2.4 km || 
|-id=699 bgcolor=#E9E9E9
| 365699 ||  || — || October 13, 2010 || Mount Lemmon || Mount Lemmon Survey || — || align=right | 2.2 km || 
|-id=700 bgcolor=#d6d6d6
| 365700 ||  || — || October 9, 2010 || Catalina || CSS || — || align=right | 3.8 km || 
|}

365701–365800 

|-bgcolor=#E9E9E9
| 365701 ||  || — || October 16, 2001 || Kitt Peak || Spacewatch || — || align=right | 1.8 km || 
|-id=702 bgcolor=#E9E9E9
| 365702 ||  || — || June 27, 2005 || Mount Lemmon || Mount Lemmon Survey || — || align=right | 1.6 km || 
|-id=703 bgcolor=#d6d6d6
| 365703 ||  || — || September 11, 2010 || Mount Lemmon || Mount Lemmon Survey || — || align=right | 3.1 km || 
|-id=704 bgcolor=#d6d6d6
| 365704 ||  || — || October 29, 2005 || Catalina || CSS || — || align=right | 2.5 km || 
|-id=705 bgcolor=#E9E9E9
| 365705 ||  || — || March 15, 2004 || Kitt Peak || Spacewatch || — || align=right | 2.3 km || 
|-id=706 bgcolor=#d6d6d6
| 365706 ||  || — || March 13, 2007 || Kitt Peak || Spacewatch || — || align=right | 3.2 km || 
|-id=707 bgcolor=#E9E9E9
| 365707 ||  || — || August 31, 2005 || Palomar || NEAT || MRX || align=right | 1.1 km || 
|-id=708 bgcolor=#d6d6d6
| 365708 ||  || — || December 7, 2005 || Kitt Peak || Spacewatch || — || align=right | 3.0 km || 
|-id=709 bgcolor=#d6d6d6
| 365709 ||  || — || April 30, 2008 || Mount Lemmon || Mount Lemmon Survey || TEL || align=right | 1.6 km || 
|-id=710 bgcolor=#d6d6d6
| 365710 ||  || — || April 1, 2008 || Kitt Peak || Spacewatch || EOS || align=right | 1.6 km || 
|-id=711 bgcolor=#E9E9E9
| 365711 ||  || — || December 13, 2006 || Mount Lemmon || Mount Lemmon Survey || — || align=right | 2.3 km || 
|-id=712 bgcolor=#E9E9E9
| 365712 ||  || — || July 22, 2001 || Palomar || NEAT || — || align=right | 1.2 km || 
|-id=713 bgcolor=#d6d6d6
| 365713 ||  || — || May 5, 2008 || Mount Lemmon || Mount Lemmon Survey || URS || align=right | 3.7 km || 
|-id=714 bgcolor=#d6d6d6
| 365714 ||  || — || October 14, 2010 || Mount Lemmon || Mount Lemmon Survey || — || align=right | 3.5 km || 
|-id=715 bgcolor=#d6d6d6
| 365715 ||  || — || October 28, 2010 || Kitt Peak || Spacewatch || — || align=right | 3.4 km || 
|-id=716 bgcolor=#d6d6d6
| 365716 ||  || — || November 10, 2010 || Mount Lemmon || Mount Lemmon Survey || — || align=right | 3.8 km || 
|-id=717 bgcolor=#d6d6d6
| 365717 ||  || — || December 4, 2005 || Kitt Peak || Spacewatch || — || align=right | 3.1 km || 
|-id=718 bgcolor=#E9E9E9
| 365718 ||  || — || September 18, 2010 || Mount Lemmon || Mount Lemmon Survey || — || align=right | 2.1 km || 
|-id=719 bgcolor=#d6d6d6
| 365719 ||  || — || September 11, 2010 || Mount Lemmon || Mount Lemmon Survey || — || align=right | 3.2 km || 
|-id=720 bgcolor=#d6d6d6
| 365720 ||  || — || November 11, 2010 || Mount Lemmon || Mount Lemmon Survey || — || align=right | 3.9 km || 
|-id=721 bgcolor=#d6d6d6
| 365721 ||  || — || May 31, 2003 || Cerro Tololo || M. W. Buie || — || align=right | 2.5 km || 
|-id=722 bgcolor=#d6d6d6
| 365722 ||  || — || November 29, 2005 || Kitt Peak || Spacewatch || — || align=right | 3.7 km || 
|-id=723 bgcolor=#d6d6d6
| 365723 ||  || — || July 29, 2009 || Kitt Peak || Spacewatch || — || align=right | 3.7 km || 
|-id=724 bgcolor=#C2FFFF
| 365724 ||  || — || November 13, 2010 || Mount Lemmon || Mount Lemmon Survey || L4 || align=right | 10 km || 
|-id=725 bgcolor=#d6d6d6
| 365725 ||  || — || December 1, 2005 || Kitt Peak || Spacewatch || — || align=right | 3.1 km || 
|-id=726 bgcolor=#d6d6d6
| 365726 ||  || — || March 11, 2007 || Mount Lemmon || Mount Lemmon Survey || — || align=right | 2.7 km || 
|-id=727 bgcolor=#E9E9E9
| 365727 ||  || — || September 23, 2001 || Kitt Peak || Spacewatch || — || align=right | 1.9 km || 
|-id=728 bgcolor=#E9E9E9
| 365728 ||  || — || January 14, 2003 || Palomar || NEAT || — || align=right | 2.7 km || 
|-id=729 bgcolor=#d6d6d6
| 365729 ||  || — || February 13, 2002 || Kitt Peak || Spacewatch || — || align=right | 3.3 km || 
|-id=730 bgcolor=#E9E9E9
| 365730 ||  || — || November 17, 2006 || Mount Lemmon || Mount Lemmon Survey || MAR || align=right | 1.3 km || 
|-id=731 bgcolor=#d6d6d6
| 365731 ||  || — || October 2, 2005 || Mount Lemmon || Mount Lemmon Survey || KOR || align=right | 1.3 km || 
|-id=732 bgcolor=#d6d6d6
| 365732 ||  || — || October 8, 2004 || Kitt Peak || Spacewatch || — || align=right | 2.7 km || 
|-id=733 bgcolor=#E9E9E9
| 365733 ||  || — || October 20, 2006 || Mount Lemmon || Mount Lemmon Survey || — || align=right | 1.2 km || 
|-id=734 bgcolor=#E9E9E9
| 365734 ||  || — || February 10, 2008 || Kitt Peak || Spacewatch || — || align=right | 2.6 km || 
|-id=735 bgcolor=#d6d6d6
| 365735 ||  || — || October 25, 2005 || Kitt Peak || Spacewatch || — || align=right | 2.6 km || 
|-id=736 bgcolor=#d6d6d6
| 365736 ||  || — || December 8, 2004 || Socorro || LINEAR || 7:4 || align=right | 6.0 km || 
|-id=737 bgcolor=#d6d6d6
| 365737 ||  || — || October 5, 2004 || Kitt Peak || Spacewatch || — || align=right | 3.2 km || 
|-id=738 bgcolor=#d6d6d6
| 365738 ||  || — || February 25, 2007 || Kitt Peak || Spacewatch || — || align=right | 2.4 km || 
|-id=739 bgcolor=#d6d6d6
| 365739 Peterbecker ||  ||  || September 15, 2004 || Drebach || A. Knöfel || — || align=right | 3.3 km || 
|-id=740 bgcolor=#E9E9E9
| 365740 ||  || — || October 9, 2005 || Kitt Peak || Spacewatch || — || align=right | 2.4 km || 
|-id=741 bgcolor=#d6d6d6
| 365741 ||  || — || September 6, 2004 || Palomar || NEAT || — || align=right | 4.5 km || 
|-id=742 bgcolor=#E9E9E9
| 365742 ||  || — || September 24, 2005 || Palomar || NEAT || HEN || align=right | 1.4 km || 
|-id=743 bgcolor=#d6d6d6
| 365743 ||  || — || November 1, 2010 || Kitt Peak || Spacewatch || EOS || align=right | 2.4 km || 
|-id=744 bgcolor=#d6d6d6
| 365744 ||  || — || February 26, 2007 || Catalina || CSS || — || align=right | 3.7 km || 
|-id=745 bgcolor=#E9E9E9
| 365745 ||  || — || February 8, 2008 || Mount Lemmon || Mount Lemmon Survey || — || align=right | 1.5 km || 
|-id=746 bgcolor=#d6d6d6
| 365746 ||  || — || September 19, 1998 || Kitt Peak || Spacewatch || — || align=right | 2.9 km || 
|-id=747 bgcolor=#d6d6d6
| 365747 ||  || — || January 7, 2006 || Mount Lemmon || Mount Lemmon Survey || — || align=right | 3.2 km || 
|-id=748 bgcolor=#d6d6d6
| 365748 ||  || — || September 16, 2009 || Mount Lemmon || Mount Lemmon Survey || — || align=right | 3.4 km || 
|-id=749 bgcolor=#d6d6d6
| 365749 ||  || — || November 3, 2005 || Mount Lemmon || Mount Lemmon Survey || — || align=right | 3.3 km || 
|-id=750 bgcolor=#E9E9E9
| 365750 ||  || — || September 25, 2006 || Kitt Peak || Spacewatch || GER || align=right | 2.2 km || 
|-id=751 bgcolor=#fefefe
| 365751 ||  || — || September 5, 2000 || Anderson Mesa || LONEOS || — || align=right data-sort-value="0.90" | 900 m || 
|-id=752 bgcolor=#d6d6d6
| 365752 ||  || — || November 7, 2010 || Mount Lemmon || Mount Lemmon Survey || — || align=right | 3.9 km || 
|-id=753 bgcolor=#d6d6d6
| 365753 ||  || — || November 22, 2005 || Kitt Peak || Spacewatch || TEL || align=right | 1.6 km || 
|-id=754 bgcolor=#d6d6d6
| 365754 ||  || — || December 30, 2005 || Kitt Peak || Spacewatch || — || align=right | 3.2 km || 
|-id=755 bgcolor=#E9E9E9
| 365755 ||  || — || August 26, 2005 || Palomar || NEAT || — || align=right | 2.6 km || 
|-id=756 bgcolor=#C7FF8F
| 365756 ISON ||  ||  || November 4, 2010 || Mayhill-ISON || L. Elenin || unusualcritical || align=right | 6.1 km || 
|-id=757 bgcolor=#E9E9E9
| 365757 ||  || — || December 17, 2006 || Mount Lemmon || Mount Lemmon Survey || — || align=right | 2.4 km || 
|-id=758 bgcolor=#d6d6d6
| 365758 ||  || — || December 1, 2010 || Tzec Maun || Tzec Maun Obs. || EOS || align=right | 2.1 km || 
|-id=759 bgcolor=#d6d6d6
| 365759 ||  || — || October 30, 2010 || Kitt Peak || Spacewatch || — || align=right | 3.2 km || 
|-id=760 bgcolor=#E9E9E9
| 365760 ||  || — || April 5, 2008 || Kitt Peak || Spacewatch || — || align=right | 2.6 km || 
|-id=761 bgcolor=#E9E9E9
| 365761 Popovici ||  ||  || March 13, 2008 || La Silla || EURONEAR || — || align=right | 1.0 km || 
|-id=762 bgcolor=#E9E9E9
| 365762 ||  || — || August 16, 1993 || Caussols || E. W. Elst || — || align=right | 1.4 km || 
|-id=763 bgcolor=#d6d6d6
| 365763 ||  || — || July 28, 2009 || Kitt Peak || Spacewatch || EOS || align=right | 2.2 km || 
|-id=764 bgcolor=#E9E9E9
| 365764 ||  || — || January 8, 2003 || Socorro || LINEAR || — || align=right | 1.3 km || 
|-id=765 bgcolor=#d6d6d6
| 365765 ||  || — || December 14, 2004 || Kitt Peak || Spacewatch || — || align=right | 4.1 km || 
|-id=766 bgcolor=#d6d6d6
| 365766 ||  || — || October 25, 2005 || Kitt Peak || Spacewatch || — || align=right | 2.1 km || 
|-id=767 bgcolor=#E9E9E9
| 365767 ||  || — || November 19, 2001 || Anderson Mesa || LONEOS || — || align=right | 2.7 km || 
|-id=768 bgcolor=#E9E9E9
| 365768 ||  || — || April 15, 2008 || Mount Lemmon || Mount Lemmon Survey || — || align=right | 2.1 km || 
|-id=769 bgcolor=#d6d6d6
| 365769 ||  || — || December 6, 1999 || Socorro || LINEAR || — || align=right | 3.3 km || 
|-id=770 bgcolor=#E9E9E9
| 365770 ||  || — || September 25, 2005 || Kitt Peak || Spacewatch || AGN || align=right | 1.3 km || 
|-id=771 bgcolor=#E9E9E9
| 365771 ||  || — || July 20, 2001 || Palomar || NEAT || — || align=right | 1.3 km || 
|-id=772 bgcolor=#d6d6d6
| 365772 ||  || — || February 21, 2007 || Kitt Peak || Spacewatch || — || align=right | 3.1 km || 
|-id=773 bgcolor=#d6d6d6
| 365773 ||  || — || January 24, 2006 || Kitt Peak || Spacewatch || EMA || align=right | 3.6 km || 
|-id=774 bgcolor=#E9E9E9
| 365774 ||  || — || July 8, 1997 || Kitt Peak || Spacewatch || BRG || align=right | 2.1 km || 
|-id=775 bgcolor=#d6d6d6
| 365775 ||  || — || December 3, 2010 || Mount Lemmon || Mount Lemmon Survey || — || align=right | 3.9 km || 
|-id=776 bgcolor=#d6d6d6
| 365776 ||  || — || October 22, 2005 || Kitt Peak || Spacewatch || — || align=right | 2.3 km || 
|-id=777 bgcolor=#E9E9E9
| 365777 ||  || — || January 13, 2002 || Apache Point || SDSS || — || align=right | 2.3 km || 
|-id=778 bgcolor=#d6d6d6
| 365778 ||  || — || November 2, 2010 || Kitt Peak || Spacewatch || EOS || align=right | 2.3 km || 
|-id=779 bgcolor=#d6d6d6
| 365779 ||  || — || December 27, 2000 || Kitt Peak || Spacewatch || — || align=right | 2.4 km || 
|-id=780 bgcolor=#E9E9E9
| 365780 ||  || — || October 28, 2001 || Palomar || NEAT || — || align=right | 1.9 km || 
|-id=781 bgcolor=#d6d6d6
| 365781 ||  || — || November 6, 1999 || Kitt Peak || Spacewatch || — || align=right | 2.2 km || 
|-id=782 bgcolor=#d6d6d6
| 365782 ||  || — || December 2, 2005 || Kitt Peak || Spacewatch || EOS || align=right | 2.1 km || 
|-id=783 bgcolor=#E9E9E9
| 365783 ||  || — || May 31, 2008 || Mount Lemmon || Mount Lemmon Survey || — || align=right | 2.4 km || 
|-id=784 bgcolor=#d6d6d6
| 365784 ||  || — || December 2, 2004 || Palomar || NEAT || — || align=right | 4.4 km || 
|-id=785 bgcolor=#d6d6d6
| 365785 ||  || — || December 1, 2005 || Kitt Peak || Spacewatch || — || align=right | 2.8 km || 
|-id=786 bgcolor=#d6d6d6
| 365786 Florencelosse || 2010 YJ ||  || December 26, 2010 || St Pardon de Conques || St Pardon de Conques Obs. || — || align=right | 4.3 km || 
|-id=787 bgcolor=#E9E9E9
| 365787 ||  || — || November 25, 2006 || Kitt Peak || Spacewatch || MAR || align=right | 1.2 km || 
|-id=788 bgcolor=#E9E9E9
| 365788 ||  || — || March 29, 2008 || Kitt Peak || Spacewatch || — || align=right | 2.4 km || 
|-id=789 bgcolor=#d6d6d6
| 365789 ||  || — || December 19, 2004 || Catalina || CSS || TIR || align=right | 3.1 km || 
|-id=790 bgcolor=#d6d6d6
| 365790 ||  || — || February 1, 2010 || WISE || WISE || URS || align=right | 3.8 km || 
|-id=791 bgcolor=#fefefe
| 365791 ||  || — || January 3, 2000 || Kitt Peak || Spacewatch || — || align=right data-sort-value="0.83" | 830 m || 
|-id=792 bgcolor=#E9E9E9
| 365792 ||  || — || December 21, 2001 || Kitt Peak || Spacewatch || WIT || align=right | 1.3 km || 
|-id=793 bgcolor=#E9E9E9
| 365793 ||  || — || December 18, 2001 || Kitt Peak || Spacewatch || — || align=right | 1.9 km || 
|-id=794 bgcolor=#d6d6d6
| 365794 ||  || — || December 10, 2004 || Kitt Peak || Spacewatch || THB || align=right | 3.6 km || 
|-id=795 bgcolor=#d6d6d6
| 365795 ||  || — || October 15, 2009 || Catalina || CSS || — || align=right | 2.4 km || 
|-id=796 bgcolor=#d6d6d6
| 365796 ||  || — || December 28, 2005 || Kitt Peak || Spacewatch || — || align=right | 3.6 km || 
|-id=797 bgcolor=#FA8072
| 365797 ||  || — || September 15, 2007 || Catalina || CSS || H || align=right data-sort-value="0.77" | 770 m || 
|-id=798 bgcolor=#d6d6d6
| 365798 ||  || — || November 3, 2004 || Palomar || NEAT || — || align=right | 3.7 km || 
|-id=799 bgcolor=#d6d6d6
| 365799 ||  || — || January 25, 2011 || Kitt Peak || Spacewatch || — || align=right | 3.6 km || 
|-id=800 bgcolor=#d6d6d6
| 365800 ||  || — || January 13, 2011 || Kitt Peak || Spacewatch || — || align=right | 3.3 km || 
|}

365801–365900 

|-bgcolor=#d6d6d6
| 365801 ||  || — || October 17, 2003 || Kitt Peak || Spacewatch || EOS || align=right | 2.6 km || 
|-id=802 bgcolor=#d6d6d6
| 365802 ||  || — || January 13, 2005 || Catalina || CSS || — || align=right | 4.3 km || 
|-id=803 bgcolor=#E9E9E9
| 365803 ||  || — || September 5, 1999 || Catalina || CSS || — || align=right | 2.7 km || 
|-id=804 bgcolor=#d6d6d6
| 365804 ||  || — || September 24, 1992 || Kitt Peak || Spacewatch || — || align=right | 3.5 km || 
|-id=805 bgcolor=#d6d6d6
| 365805 ||  || — || September 4, 2003 || Kitt Peak || Spacewatch || — || align=right | 2.8 km || 
|-id=806 bgcolor=#d6d6d6
| 365806 ||  || — || December 20, 2004 || Mount Lemmon || Mount Lemmon Survey || — || align=right | 4.3 km || 
|-id=807 bgcolor=#E9E9E9
| 365807 ||  || — || October 29, 2008 || Mount Lemmon || Mount Lemmon Survey || EUN || align=right | 1.5 km || 
|-id=808 bgcolor=#fefefe
| 365808 ||  || — || January 7, 2006 || Kitt Peak || Spacewatch || FLO || align=right data-sort-value="0.56" | 560 m || 
|-id=809 bgcolor=#d6d6d6
| 365809 ||  || — || July 30, 2005 || Palomar || NEAT || VER || align=right | 3.2 km || 
|-id=810 bgcolor=#E9E9E9
| 365810 ||  || — || August 4, 2002 || Palomar || NEAT || — || align=right | 1.8 km || 
|-id=811 bgcolor=#E9E9E9
| 365811 ||  || — || February 20, 2009 || Kitt Peak || Spacewatch || — || align=right | 2.5 km || 
|-id=812 bgcolor=#d6d6d6
| 365812 ||  || — || October 1, 2000 || Socorro || LINEAR || TIR || align=right | 3.3 km || 
|-id=813 bgcolor=#fefefe
| 365813 ||  || — || January 18, 2009 || XuYi || PMO NEO || FLO || align=right data-sort-value="0.72" | 720 m || 
|-id=814 bgcolor=#E9E9E9
| 365814 ||  || — || January 26, 2004 || Anderson Mesa || LONEOS || — || align=right | 1.3 km || 
|-id=815 bgcolor=#fefefe
| 365815 ||  || — || January 5, 2006 || Mount Lemmon || Mount Lemmon Survey || — || align=right data-sort-value="0.64" | 640 m || 
|-id=816 bgcolor=#fefefe
| 365816 ||  || — || October 21, 2001 || Socorro || LINEAR || FLO || align=right data-sort-value="0.67" | 670 m || 
|-id=817 bgcolor=#d6d6d6
| 365817 ||  || — || September 18, 2006 || Catalina || CSS || — || align=right | 3.6 km || 
|-id=818 bgcolor=#fefefe
| 365818 ||  || — || October 23, 2004 || Kitt Peak || Spacewatch || MAS || align=right data-sort-value="0.94" | 940 m || 
|-id=819 bgcolor=#d6d6d6
| 365819 ||  || — || June 13, 2010 || Mount Lemmon || Mount Lemmon Survey || — || align=right | 2.7 km || 
|-id=820 bgcolor=#fefefe
| 365820 ||  || — || March 9, 2002 || Palomar || NEAT || — || align=right data-sort-value="0.78" | 780 m || 
|-id=821 bgcolor=#fefefe
| 365821 ||  || — || April 4, 2002 || Kitt Peak || Spacewatch || — || align=right data-sort-value="0.71" | 710 m || 
|-id=822 bgcolor=#fefefe
| 365822 ||  || — || April 5, 2000 || Socorro || LINEAR || — || align=right data-sort-value="0.67" | 670 m || 
|-id=823 bgcolor=#fefefe
| 365823 ||  || — || March 13, 2005 || Kitt Peak || Spacewatch || H || align=right data-sort-value="0.80" | 800 m || 
|-id=824 bgcolor=#fefefe
| 365824 ||  || — || December 14, 2004 || Kitt Peak || Spacewatch || — || align=right data-sort-value="0.61" | 610 m || 
|-id=825 bgcolor=#fefefe
| 365825 ||  || — || September 18, 1995 || Kitt Peak || Spacewatch || — || align=right data-sort-value="0.67" | 670 m || 
|-id=826 bgcolor=#fefefe
| 365826 ||  || — || November 1, 2008 || Mount Lemmon || Mount Lemmon Survey || — || align=right data-sort-value="0.59" | 590 m || 
|-id=827 bgcolor=#fefefe
| 365827 ||  || — || April 25, 2003 || Kitt Peak || Spacewatch || — || align=right data-sort-value="0.57" | 570 m || 
|-id=828 bgcolor=#fefefe
| 365828 ||  || — || March 3, 2009 || Kitt Peak || Spacewatch || NYS || align=right data-sort-value="0.66" | 660 m || 
|-id=829 bgcolor=#fefefe
| 365829 ||  || — || January 31, 2009 || Mount Lemmon || Mount Lemmon Survey || V || align=right data-sort-value="0.65" | 650 m || 
|-id=830 bgcolor=#fefefe
| 365830 ||  || — || January 15, 2009 || Kitt Peak || Spacewatch || NYS || align=right data-sort-value="0.65" | 650 m || 
|-id=831 bgcolor=#E9E9E9
| 365831 ||  || — || March 11, 2010 || WISE || WISE || — || align=right | 1.7 km || 
|-id=832 bgcolor=#fefefe
| 365832 ||  || — || October 19, 2003 || Palomar || NEAT || H || align=right data-sort-value="0.71" | 710 m || 
|-id=833 bgcolor=#fefefe
| 365833 ||  || — || September 25, 2011 || Haleakala || Pan-STARRS || H || align=right data-sort-value="0.90" | 900 m || 
|-id=834 bgcolor=#fefefe
| 365834 ||  || — || January 7, 1999 || Kitt Peak || Spacewatch || — || align=right data-sort-value="0.64" | 640 m || 
|-id=835 bgcolor=#E9E9E9
| 365835 ||  || — || August 19, 2006 || Kitt Peak || Spacewatch || — || align=right | 2.2 km || 
|-id=836 bgcolor=#E9E9E9
| 365836 ||  || — || April 19, 2006 || Kitt Peak || Spacewatch || — || align=right | 1.6 km || 
|-id=837 bgcolor=#fefefe
| 365837 ||  || — || September 28, 2001 || Palomar || NEAT || — || align=right data-sort-value="0.75" | 750 m || 
|-id=838 bgcolor=#fefefe
| 365838 ||  || — || April 13, 2002 || Palomar || NEAT || — || align=right data-sort-value="0.95" | 950 m || 
|-id=839 bgcolor=#fefefe
| 365839 ||  || — || November 4, 2004 || Kitt Peak || Spacewatch || — || align=right data-sort-value="0.78" | 780 m || 
|-id=840 bgcolor=#fefefe
| 365840 ||  || — || February 4, 2005 || Palomar || NEAT || — || align=right | 1.1 km || 
|-id=841 bgcolor=#fefefe
| 365841 ||  || — || March 26, 2006 || Mount Lemmon || Mount Lemmon Survey || — || align=right data-sort-value="0.75" | 750 m || 
|-id=842 bgcolor=#fefefe
| 365842 ||  || — || March 12, 2003 || Kitt Peak || Spacewatch || — || align=right data-sort-value="0.72" | 720 m || 
|-id=843 bgcolor=#E9E9E9
| 365843 ||  || — || May 18, 2010 || WISE || WISE || — || align=right | 1.3 km || 
|-id=844 bgcolor=#fefefe
| 365844 ||  || — || February 9, 2002 || Kitt Peak || Spacewatch || — || align=right data-sort-value="0.61" | 610 m || 
|-id=845 bgcolor=#E9E9E9
| 365845 ||  || — || January 22, 2004 || Palomar || NEAT || — || align=right | 1.9 km || 
|-id=846 bgcolor=#E9E9E9
| 365846 ||  || — || November 9, 2007 || Kitt Peak || Spacewatch || — || align=right data-sort-value="0.98" | 980 m || 
|-id=847 bgcolor=#fefefe
| 365847 ||  || — || October 9, 2004 || Kitt Peak || Spacewatch || FLO || align=right data-sort-value="0.61" | 610 m || 
|-id=848 bgcolor=#fefefe
| 365848 ||  || — || February 11, 2002 || Kitt Peak || Spacewatch || NYS || align=right data-sort-value="0.58" | 580 m || 
|-id=849 bgcolor=#d6d6d6
| 365849 ||  || — || April 26, 1993 || Kitt Peak || Spacewatch || — || align=right | 3.2 km || 
|-id=850 bgcolor=#fefefe
| 365850 ||  || — || October 24, 2005 || Mauna Kea || A. Boattini || — || align=right data-sort-value="0.79" | 790 m || 
|-id=851 bgcolor=#E9E9E9
| 365851 ||  || — || September 19, 2006 || Catalina || CSS || — || align=right | 2.1 km || 
|-id=852 bgcolor=#fefefe
| 365852 ||  || — || December 3, 2000 || Kitt Peak || Spacewatch || NYS || align=right data-sort-value="0.73" | 730 m || 
|-id=853 bgcolor=#E9E9E9
| 365853 ||  || — || April 16, 2004 || Socorro || LINEAR || GAL || align=right | 2.2 km || 
|-id=854 bgcolor=#E9E9E9
| 365854 ||  || — || January 30, 2004 || Kitt Peak || Spacewatch || — || align=right | 1.2 km || 
|-id=855 bgcolor=#fefefe
| 365855 ||  || — || December 5, 2008 || Kitt Peak || Spacewatch || — || align=right data-sort-value="0.98" | 980 m || 
|-id=856 bgcolor=#E9E9E9
| 365856 ||  || — || October 14, 1998 || Xinglong || SCAP || — || align=right | 4.8 km || 
|-id=857 bgcolor=#fefefe
| 365857 ||  || — || October 8, 2007 || Catalina || CSS || — || align=right | 1.4 km || 
|-id=858 bgcolor=#E9E9E9
| 365858 ||  || — || October 3, 2002 || Palomar || NEAT || — || align=right | 1.7 km || 
|-id=859 bgcolor=#fefefe
| 365859 ||  || — || February 6, 2006 || Mount Lemmon || Mount Lemmon Survey || V || align=right data-sort-value="0.87" | 870 m || 
|-id=860 bgcolor=#fefefe
| 365860 ||  || — || October 10, 2004 || Kitt Peak || Spacewatch || — || align=right data-sort-value="0.78" | 780 m || 
|-id=861 bgcolor=#fefefe
| 365861 ||  || — || September 13, 2007 || Kitt Peak || Spacewatch || — || align=right data-sort-value="0.79" | 790 m || 
|-id=862 bgcolor=#fefefe
| 365862 ||  || — || November 12, 2001 || Kitt Peak || Spacewatch || — || align=right data-sort-value="0.56" | 560 m || 
|-id=863 bgcolor=#fefefe
| 365863 ||  || — || December 18, 2004 || Mount Lemmon || Mount Lemmon Survey || — || align=right data-sort-value="0.66" | 660 m || 
|-id=864 bgcolor=#fefefe
| 365864 ||  || — || September 15, 2007 || Kitt Peak || Spacewatch || NYS || align=right data-sort-value="0.68" | 680 m || 
|-id=865 bgcolor=#fefefe
| 365865 ||  || — || October 29, 1998 || Kitt Peak || Spacewatch || — || align=right data-sort-value="0.69" | 690 m || 
|-id=866 bgcolor=#fefefe
| 365866 ||  || — || November 10, 2004 || Kitt Peak || Spacewatch || — || align=right data-sort-value="0.85" | 850 m || 
|-id=867 bgcolor=#fefefe
| 365867 ||  || — || September 13, 2007 || Mount Lemmon || Mount Lemmon Survey || — || align=right data-sort-value="0.94" | 940 m || 
|-id=868 bgcolor=#E9E9E9
| 365868 ||  || — || January 15, 2004 || Kitt Peak || Spacewatch || — || align=right | 1.4 km || 
|-id=869 bgcolor=#fefefe
| 365869 ||  || — || December 28, 2005 || Mount Lemmon || Mount Lemmon Survey || — || align=right data-sort-value="0.79" | 790 m || 
|-id=870 bgcolor=#fefefe
| 365870 ||  || — || May 1, 2006 || Kitt Peak || Spacewatch || NYS || align=right data-sort-value="0.55" | 550 m || 
|-id=871 bgcolor=#d6d6d6
| 365871 ||  || — || April 19, 2004 || Kitt Peak || Spacewatch || — || align=right | 4.1 km || 
|-id=872 bgcolor=#fefefe
| 365872 ||  || — || August 21, 2007 || Anderson Mesa || LONEOS || — || align=right | 1.0 km || 
|-id=873 bgcolor=#fefefe
| 365873 ||  || — || February 3, 2009 || Kitt Peak || Spacewatch || MAS || align=right data-sort-value="0.70" | 700 m || 
|-id=874 bgcolor=#fefefe
| 365874 ||  || — || January 18, 2005 || Catalina || CSS || — || align=right data-sort-value="0.95" | 950 m || 
|-id=875 bgcolor=#fefefe
| 365875 ||  || — || May 10, 2003 || Kitt Peak || Spacewatch || — || align=right data-sort-value="0.76" | 760 m || 
|-id=876 bgcolor=#fefefe
| 365876 ||  || — || December 9, 2004 || Kitt Peak || Spacewatch || — || align=right data-sort-value="0.91" | 910 m || 
|-id=877 bgcolor=#fefefe
| 365877 ||  || — || March 27, 2009 || Siding Spring || SSS || — || align=right | 1.3 km || 
|-id=878 bgcolor=#fefefe
| 365878 ||  || — || May 6, 2006 || Mount Lemmon || Mount Lemmon Survey || FLO || align=right data-sort-value="0.62" | 620 m || 
|-id=879 bgcolor=#fefefe
| 365879 ||  || — || May 25, 2006 || Mauna Kea || P. A. Wiegert || — || align=right data-sort-value="0.56" | 560 m || 
|-id=880 bgcolor=#fefefe
| 365880 ||  || — || September 11, 2004 || Kitt Peak || Spacewatch || — || align=right data-sort-value="0.57" | 570 m || 
|-id=881 bgcolor=#E9E9E9
| 365881 ||  || — || November 5, 2007 || Kitt Peak || Spacewatch || — || align=right data-sort-value="0.82" | 820 m || 
|-id=882 bgcolor=#E9E9E9
| 365882 ||  || — || May 17, 2009 || Kitt Peak || Spacewatch || — || align=right | 1.1 km || 
|-id=883 bgcolor=#E9E9E9
| 365883 ||  || — || January 13, 1999 || Kitt Peak || Spacewatch || — || align=right | 1.2 km || 
|-id=884 bgcolor=#fefefe
| 365884 ||  || — || October 13, 2004 || Kitt Peak || Spacewatch || V || align=right data-sort-value="0.80" | 800 m || 
|-id=885 bgcolor=#fefefe
| 365885 ||  || — || October 22, 2011 || Kitt Peak || Spacewatch || — || align=right | 1.00 km || 
|-id=886 bgcolor=#E9E9E9
| 365886 ||  || — || January 17, 2004 || Palomar || NEAT || — || align=right | 1.2 km || 
|-id=887 bgcolor=#d6d6d6
| 365887 ||  || — || March 18, 2009 || Kitt Peak || Spacewatch || JLI || align=right | 4.1 km || 
|-id=888 bgcolor=#fefefe
| 365888 ||  || — || May 9, 2005 || Catalina || CSS || H || align=right data-sort-value="0.66" | 660 m || 
|-id=889 bgcolor=#d6d6d6
| 365889 ||  || — || March 24, 2003 || Kitt Peak || Spacewatch || — || align=right | 3.2 km || 
|-id=890 bgcolor=#fefefe
| 365890 ||  || — || December 30, 2008 || Mount Lemmon || Mount Lemmon Survey || FLO || align=right data-sort-value="0.72" | 720 m || 
|-id=891 bgcolor=#d6d6d6
| 365891 ||  || — || September 29, 2005 || Kitt Peak || Spacewatch || — || align=right | 2.6 km || 
|-id=892 bgcolor=#fefefe
| 365892 ||  || — || March 31, 2003 || Anderson Mesa || LONEOS || — || align=right data-sort-value="0.97" | 970 m || 
|-id=893 bgcolor=#fefefe
| 365893 ||  || — || August 31, 1995 || La Silla || C.-I. Lagerkvist || — || align=right data-sort-value="0.60" | 600 m || 
|-id=894 bgcolor=#fefefe
| 365894 ||  || — || December 20, 2004 || Mount Lemmon || Mount Lemmon Survey || MAS || align=right data-sort-value="0.64" | 640 m || 
|-id=895 bgcolor=#d6d6d6
| 365895 ||  || — || October 23, 2011 || Haleakala || Pan-STARRS || — || align=right | 4.4 km || 
|-id=896 bgcolor=#E9E9E9
| 365896 ||  || — || August 21, 2006 || Goodricke-Pigott || R. A. Tucker || — || align=right | 3.1 km || 
|-id=897 bgcolor=#fefefe
| 365897 ||  || — || December 3, 2004 || Kitt Peak || Spacewatch || V || align=right data-sort-value="0.76" | 760 m || 
|-id=898 bgcolor=#E9E9E9
| 365898 ||  || — || March 19, 2009 || Mount Lemmon || Mount Lemmon Survey || HNS || align=right | 1.4 km || 
|-id=899 bgcolor=#fefefe
| 365899 ||  || — || September 18, 2001 || Apache Point || SDSS || — || align=right data-sort-value="0.67" | 670 m || 
|-id=900 bgcolor=#fefefe
| 365900 ||  || — || November 3, 2004 || Kitt Peak || Spacewatch || FLO || align=right data-sort-value="0.71" | 710 m || 
|}

365901–366000 

|-bgcolor=#E9E9E9
| 365901 ||  || — || April 30, 2004 || Kitt Peak || Spacewatch || DOR || align=right | 2.1 km || 
|-id=902 bgcolor=#E9E9E9
| 365902 ||  || — || August 27, 2006 || Kitt Peak || Spacewatch || HEN || align=right data-sort-value="0.88" | 880 m || 
|-id=903 bgcolor=#fefefe
| 365903 ||  || — || October 21, 2011 || Mount Lemmon || Mount Lemmon Survey || — || align=right data-sort-value="0.92" | 920 m || 
|-id=904 bgcolor=#E9E9E9
| 365904 ||  || — || September 15, 2007 || Mount Lemmon || Mount Lemmon Survey || — || align=right data-sort-value="0.94" | 940 m || 
|-id=905 bgcolor=#d6d6d6
| 365905 ||  || — || February 20, 2007 || Siding Spring || SSS || — || align=right | 3.8 km || 
|-id=906 bgcolor=#E9E9E9
| 365906 ||  || — || December 25, 2003 || Kitt Peak || Spacewatch || — || align=right | 1.0 km || 
|-id=907 bgcolor=#fefefe
| 365907 ||  || — || November 20, 2001 || Socorro || LINEAR || FLO || align=right data-sort-value="0.68" | 680 m || 
|-id=908 bgcolor=#d6d6d6
| 365908 ||  || — || November 24, 2006 || Kitt Peak || Spacewatch || — || align=right | 1.8 km || 
|-id=909 bgcolor=#E9E9E9
| 365909 ||  || — || March 26, 2004 || Socorro || LINEAR || — || align=right | 3.2 km || 
|-id=910 bgcolor=#E9E9E9
| 365910 ||  || — || November 8, 2007 || Kitt Peak || Spacewatch || — || align=right data-sort-value="0.98" | 980 m || 
|-id=911 bgcolor=#fefefe
| 365911 ||  || — || November 21, 2008 || Kitt Peak || Spacewatch || — || align=right data-sort-value="0.77" | 770 m || 
|-id=912 bgcolor=#d6d6d6
| 365912 ||  || — || April 16, 2007 || Catalina || CSS || — || align=right | 3.8 km || 
|-id=913 bgcolor=#fefefe
| 365913 ||  || — || December 1, 2008 || Mount Lemmon || Mount Lemmon Survey || V || align=right data-sort-value="0.74" | 740 m || 
|-id=914 bgcolor=#E9E9E9
| 365914 ||  || — || November 2, 2007 || Kitt Peak || Spacewatch || — || align=right data-sort-value="0.98" | 980 m || 
|-id=915 bgcolor=#E9E9E9
| 365915 ||  || — || December 4, 2007 || Kitt Peak || Spacewatch || EUN || align=right | 1.5 km || 
|-id=916 bgcolor=#E9E9E9
| 365916 ||  || — || November 12, 2007 || Mount Lemmon || Mount Lemmon Survey || — || align=right | 1.5 km || 
|-id=917 bgcolor=#fefefe
| 365917 ||  || — || March 26, 2003 || Kitt Peak || Spacewatch || — || align=right data-sort-value="0.84" | 840 m || 
|-id=918 bgcolor=#C2FFFF
| 365918 ||  || — || November 3, 2010 || Kitt Peak || Spacewatch || L4 || align=right | 7.9 km || 
|-id=919 bgcolor=#E9E9E9
| 365919 ||  || — || November 23, 2002 || Palomar || NEAT || GEF || align=right | 1.1 km || 
|-id=920 bgcolor=#E9E9E9
| 365920 ||  || — || December 18, 2007 || Kitt Peak || Spacewatch || — || align=right data-sort-value="0.96" | 960 m || 
|-id=921 bgcolor=#E9E9E9
| 365921 ||  || — || November 11, 2007 || Mount Lemmon || Mount Lemmon Survey || — || align=right | 1.1 km || 
|-id=922 bgcolor=#E9E9E9
| 365922 ||  || — || September 2, 2010 || Mount Lemmon || Mount Lemmon Survey || — || align=right | 2.8 km || 
|-id=923 bgcolor=#E9E9E9
| 365923 ||  || — || December 1, 2006 || Kitt Peak || Spacewatch || DOR || align=right | 2.6 km || 
|-id=924 bgcolor=#E9E9E9
| 365924 ||  || — || September 19, 2010 || Kitt Peak || Spacewatch || HOF || align=right | 2.7 km || 
|-id=925 bgcolor=#E9E9E9
| 365925 ||  || — || May 2, 2009 || Mount Lemmon || Mount Lemmon Survey || — || align=right | 2.0 km || 
|-id=926 bgcolor=#fefefe
| 365926 ||  || — || September 21, 2007 || XuYi || PMO NEO || V || align=right data-sort-value="0.61" | 610 m || 
|-id=927 bgcolor=#d6d6d6
| 365927 ||  || — || August 9, 2010 || WISE || WISE || EUP || align=right | 6.1 km || 
|-id=928 bgcolor=#E9E9E9
| 365928 ||  || — || October 27, 2006 || Catalina || CSS || — || align=right | 2.3 km || 
|-id=929 bgcolor=#E9E9E9
| 365929 ||  || — || December 31, 2007 || Kitt Peak || Spacewatch || — || align=right | 1.5 km || 
|-id=930 bgcolor=#d6d6d6
| 365930 ||  || — || April 14, 2007 || Kitt Peak || Spacewatch || THM || align=right | 2.0 km || 
|-id=931 bgcolor=#d6d6d6
| 365931 ||  || — || January 27, 2007 || Mount Lemmon || Mount Lemmon Survey || — || align=right | 2.6 km || 
|-id=932 bgcolor=#fefefe
| 365932 ||  || — || September 22, 2003 || Palomar || NEAT || V || align=right data-sort-value="0.81" | 810 m || 
|-id=933 bgcolor=#fefefe
| 365933 ||  || — || February 20, 2001 || Haleakala || NEAT || H || align=right | 1.1 km || 
|-id=934 bgcolor=#d6d6d6
| 365934 ||  || — || March 20, 2007 || Anderson Mesa || LONEOS || 7:4 || align=right | 4.5 km || 
|-id=935 bgcolor=#fefefe
| 365935 ||  || — || January 22, 2004 || Socorro || LINEAR || H || align=right data-sort-value="0.72" | 720 m || 
|-id=936 bgcolor=#fefefe
| 365936 ||  || — || October 23, 2003 || Kitt Peak || Spacewatch || — || align=right | 1.0 km || 
|-id=937 bgcolor=#FA8072
| 365937 ||  || — || May 4, 2006 || Siding Spring || SSS || — || align=right | 3.3 km || 
|-id=938 bgcolor=#fefefe
| 365938 ||  || — || November 10, 2004 || Kitt Peak || Spacewatch || — || align=right data-sort-value="0.81" | 810 m || 
|-id=939 bgcolor=#E9E9E9
| 365939 ||  || — || October 4, 2006 || Mount Lemmon || Mount Lemmon Survey || MAR || align=right | 1.4 km || 
|-id=940 bgcolor=#E9E9E9
| 365940 ||  || — || December 26, 1998 || Kitt Peak || Spacewatch || EUN || align=right | 1.4 km || 
|-id=941 bgcolor=#E9E9E9
| 365941 ||  || — || November 19, 2001 || Socorro || LINEAR || — || align=right | 2.6 km || 
|-id=942 bgcolor=#fefefe
| 365942 ||  || — || December 29, 2011 || Kitt Peak || Spacewatch || — || align=right data-sort-value="0.83" | 830 m || 
|-id=943 bgcolor=#d6d6d6
| 365943 ||  || — || December 21, 2006 || Mount Lemmon || Mount Lemmon Survey || — || align=right | 3.1 km || 
|-id=944 bgcolor=#E9E9E9
| 365944 ||  || — || March 9, 2003 || Kitt Peak || DLS || DOR || align=right | 2.3 km || 
|-id=945 bgcolor=#E9E9E9
| 365945 ||  || — || April 6, 2000 || Kitt Peak || Spacewatch || — || align=right | 1.1 km || 
|-id=946 bgcolor=#d6d6d6
| 365946 ||  || — || August 29, 2009 || Catalina || CSS || EOS || align=right | 2.7 km || 
|-id=947 bgcolor=#fefefe
| 365947 ||  || — || December 7, 2004 || Socorro || LINEAR || PHO || align=right | 1.2 km || 
|-id=948 bgcolor=#E9E9E9
| 365948 ||  || — || February 14, 2005 || La Silla || A. Boattini, H. Scholl || BRU || align=right | 4.5 km || 
|-id=949 bgcolor=#d6d6d6
| 365949 ||  || — || January 17, 2007 || Kitt Peak || Spacewatch || THM || align=right | 2.3 km || 
|-id=950 bgcolor=#E9E9E9
| 365950 ||  || — || February 3, 2008 || Mount Lemmon || Mount Lemmon Survey || — || align=right | 2.6 km || 
|-id=951 bgcolor=#d6d6d6
| 365951 ||  || — || March 20, 2002 || Kitt Peak || M. W. Buie || — || align=right | 2.1 km || 
|-id=952 bgcolor=#d6d6d6
| 365952 ||  || — || March 14, 2007 || Mount Lemmon || Mount Lemmon Survey || — || align=right | 3.2 km || 
|-id=953 bgcolor=#d6d6d6
| 365953 ||  || — || March 12, 2007 || Kitt Peak || Spacewatch || — || align=right | 2.9 km || 
|-id=954 bgcolor=#d6d6d6
| 365954 ||  || — || April 15, 2002 || Anderson Mesa || LONEOS || — || align=right | 3.9 km || 
|-id=955 bgcolor=#d6d6d6
| 365955 ||  || — || December 27, 2005 || Kitt Peak || Spacewatch || VER || align=right | 3.2 km || 
|-id=956 bgcolor=#E9E9E9
| 365956 ||  || — || April 18, 2009 || Kitt Peak || Spacewatch || MAR || align=right | 1.3 km || 
|-id=957 bgcolor=#d6d6d6
| 365957 ||  || — || February 8, 2007 || Kitt Peak || Spacewatch || — || align=right | 2.3 km || 
|-id=958 bgcolor=#d6d6d6
| 365958 ||  || — || November 29, 2005 || Junk Bond || D. Healy || THM || align=right | 2.0 km || 
|-id=959 bgcolor=#fefefe
| 365959 ||  || — || October 21, 1995 || Kitt Peak || Spacewatch || NYS || align=right data-sort-value="0.85" | 850 m || 
|-id=960 bgcolor=#d6d6d6
| 365960 ||  || — || December 11, 2010 || Catalina || CSS || 7:4 || align=right | 5.3 km || 
|-id=961 bgcolor=#E9E9E9
| 365961 ||  || — || December 12, 2006 || Palomar || NEAT || — || align=right | 3.5 km || 
|-id=962 bgcolor=#d6d6d6
| 365962 ||  || — || February 10, 2002 || Socorro || LINEAR || — || align=right | 3.3 km || 
|-id=963 bgcolor=#d6d6d6
| 365963 ||  || — || April 11, 2007 || Mount Lemmon || Mount Lemmon Survey || — || align=right | 3.1 km || 
|-id=964 bgcolor=#d6d6d6
| 365964 ||  || — || September 9, 2004 || Kitt Peak || Spacewatch || — || align=right | 3.4 km || 
|-id=965 bgcolor=#fefefe
| 365965 ||  || — || April 24, 2010 || WISE || WISE || — || align=right | 2.1 km || 
|-id=966 bgcolor=#d6d6d6
| 365966 ||  || — || December 4, 2005 || Mount Lemmon || Mount Lemmon Survey || — || align=right | 3.2 km || 
|-id=967 bgcolor=#E9E9E9
| 365967 ||  || — || October 16, 2006 || Kitt Peak || Spacewatch || HEN || align=right data-sort-value="0.79" | 790 m || 
|-id=968 bgcolor=#E9E9E9
| 365968 ||  || — || March 21, 2004 || Kitt Peak || Spacewatch || — || align=right | 2.5 km || 
|-id=969 bgcolor=#d6d6d6
| 365969 ||  || — || February 6, 2007 || Mount Lemmon || Mount Lemmon Survey || EOS || align=right | 2.0 km || 
|-id=970 bgcolor=#E9E9E9
| 365970 ||  || — || November 17, 2006 || Mount Lemmon || Mount Lemmon Survey || PAD || align=right | 1.9 km || 
|-id=971 bgcolor=#fefefe
| 365971 ||  || — || May 10, 2002 || Palomar || NEAT || — || align=right | 1.1 km || 
|-id=972 bgcolor=#E9E9E9
| 365972 ||  || — || February 8, 2008 || Bergisch Gladbac || W. Bickel || — || align=right | 1.3 km || 
|-id=973 bgcolor=#E9E9E9
| 365973 ||  || — || October 21, 2006 || Kitt Peak || Spacewatch || — || align=right | 1.5 km || 
|-id=974 bgcolor=#d6d6d6
| 365974 ||  || — || January 8, 2006 || Mount Lemmon || Mount Lemmon Survey || — || align=right | 3.8 km || 
|-id=975 bgcolor=#d6d6d6
| 365975 ||  || — || December 27, 2005 || Kitt Peak || Spacewatch || — || align=right | 3.6 km || 
|-id=976 bgcolor=#E9E9E9
| 365976 ||  || — || March 10, 2008 || Mount Lemmon || Mount Lemmon Survey || GEF || align=right | 1.7 km || 
|-id=977 bgcolor=#E9E9E9
| 365977 ||  || — || September 11, 2005 || Kitt Peak || Spacewatch || AGN || align=right | 1.2 km || 
|-id=978 bgcolor=#d6d6d6
| 365978 ||  || — || September 15, 2009 || Mount Lemmon || Mount Lemmon Survey || — || align=right | 3.0 km || 
|-id=979 bgcolor=#d6d6d6
| 365979 ||  || — || September 16, 2004 || Kitt Peak || Spacewatch || THM || align=right | 3.3 km || 
|-id=980 bgcolor=#d6d6d6
| 365980 ||  || — || February 4, 2006 || Mount Lemmon || Mount Lemmon Survey || LIX || align=right | 4.1 km || 
|-id=981 bgcolor=#E9E9E9
| 365981 ||  || — || September 11, 2010 || Kitt Peak || Spacewatch || — || align=right | 1.5 km || 
|-id=982 bgcolor=#E9E9E9
| 365982 ||  || — || October 15, 2001 || Palomar || NEAT || GEF || align=right | 1.6 km || 
|-id=983 bgcolor=#d6d6d6
| 365983 ||  || — || April 23, 2007 || Catalina || CSS || EUP || align=right | 3.8 km || 
|-id=984 bgcolor=#E9E9E9
| 365984 ||  || — || January 2, 2012 || Kitt Peak || Spacewatch || — || align=right | 3.0 km || 
|-id=985 bgcolor=#fefefe
| 365985 ||  || — || March 31, 2009 || Kitt Peak || Spacewatch || — || align=right | 1.0 km || 
|-id=986 bgcolor=#fefefe
| 365986 ||  || — || August 21, 2006 || Kitt Peak || Spacewatch || — || align=right data-sort-value="0.94" | 940 m || 
|-id=987 bgcolor=#d6d6d6
| 365987 ||  || — || November 21, 2006 || Mount Lemmon || Mount Lemmon Survey || — || align=right | 3.2 km || 
|-id=988 bgcolor=#d6d6d6
| 365988 ||  || — || November 4, 2005 || Mount Lemmon || Mount Lemmon Survey || HYG || align=right | 3.1 km || 
|-id=989 bgcolor=#E9E9E9
| 365989 ||  || — || April 1, 2008 || Mount Lemmon || Mount Lemmon Survey || AGN || align=right | 1.1 km || 
|-id=990 bgcolor=#E9E9E9
| 365990 ||  || — || September 25, 2006 || Catalina || CSS || MAR || align=right | 1.4 km || 
|-id=991 bgcolor=#E9E9E9
| 365991 ||  || — || October 29, 2006 || Mount Lemmon || Mount Lemmon Survey || WIT || align=right | 1.3 km || 
|-id=992 bgcolor=#E9E9E9
| 365992 ||  || — || October 21, 2006 || Mount Lemmon || Mount Lemmon Survey || — || align=right | 1.6 km || 
|-id=993 bgcolor=#E9E9E9
| 365993 ||  || — || December 27, 2006 || Mount Lemmon || Mount Lemmon Survey || AGN || align=right | 1.4 km || 
|-id=994 bgcolor=#E9E9E9
| 365994 ||  || — || November 12, 2001 || Socorro || LINEAR || — || align=right | 2.8 km || 
|-id=995 bgcolor=#d6d6d6
| 365995 ||  || — || February 21, 2007 || Kitt Peak || Spacewatch || — || align=right | 3.4 km || 
|-id=996 bgcolor=#d6d6d6
| 365996 ||  || — || July 16, 2004 || Cerro Tololo || M. W. Buie || — || align=right | 2.2 km || 
|-id=997 bgcolor=#d6d6d6
| 365997 ||  || — || December 21, 2006 || Mount Lemmon || Mount Lemmon Survey || — || align=right | 3.2 km || 
|-id=998 bgcolor=#fefefe
| 365998 ||  || — || September 24, 2000 || Kitt Peak || Spacewatch || — || align=right data-sort-value="0.67" | 670 m || 
|-id=999 bgcolor=#E9E9E9
| 365999 ||  || — || July 30, 2005 || Palomar || NEAT || — || align=right | 3.1 km || 
|-id=000 bgcolor=#d6d6d6
| 366000 ||  || — || March 12, 2007 || Kitt Peak || Spacewatch || — || align=right | 3.1 km || 
|}

References

External links 
 Discovery Circumstances: Numbered Minor Planets (365001)–(370000) (IAU Minor Planet Center)

0365